This is a complete list of all 1922 Statutory Instruments published in the United Kingdom in the year 1992.


1-100

 North Hull Housing Action Trust (Transfer of Property) Order 1992 (S.I. 1992/1)
 Merchant Shipping (Radio Installations) Regulations 1992 (S.I. 1992/3)
 British Technology Group Act 1991 (Modification and Saving) Order 1992 (S.I. 1992/8)
 Local Government Act 1988 (Competition) (South Wight Borough Council) (Sports and Leisure) Regulations 1992 (S.I. 1992/9)
 Income Tax (Building Societies) (Audit Powers) Regulations 1992 (S.I. 1992/10)
 Income Tax (Building Societies) (Dividends and Interest) (Amendment) Regulations 1992 (S.I. 1992/11)
 Income Tax (Deposit-takers) (Audit Powers) Regulations 1992 (S.I. 1992/12)
 Income Tax (Deposit-takers) (Interest Payments) (Amendment) Regulations 1992 (S.I. 1992/13)
 Income Tax (Deposit-takers) (Non-residents) Regulations 1992 (S.I. 1992/14)
 Income Tax (Interest Payments) (Information Powers) Regulations 1992 (S.I. 1992/15)
 National Health Service (General Dental Services) (Miscellaneous Amendments) (Scotland) Regulations 1992 (S.I. 1992/16)
 Eastbourne Water Company (Constitution and Regulation) Order 1992 (S.I. 1992/17)
 Mid-Sussex Water Company (Constitution and Regulation) Order 1992 (S.I. 1992/18)
 West Kent Water Company (Constitution and Regulation) Order 1992 (S.I. 1992/19)
 Industrial Training Levy (Construction Board) Order 1992 (S.I. 1992/21)
 Oil Lamps (Safety) (Revocation) Regulations 1992 (S.I. 1992/23)
 National Health Service (General Dental Services) (Miscellaneous Amendments) Regulations 1992 (S.I. 1992/24)
 Motor Vehicles (Type Approval for Goods Vehicles) (Great Britain) (Amendment) Regulations 1992 (S.I. 1992/25)
 Highland Regional Council (Kilfinnan Burn) Water Order 1992 (S.I. 1992/30)
 Environmental Protection (Controls on Injurious Substances) Regulations 1992 (S.I. 1992/31)
 Medicines (Medicated Animal Feeding Stuffs) Regulations 1992 (S.I. 1992/32)
 Medicines (Veterinary Drugs) (Pharmacy and Merchants' List) Order 1992 (S.I. 1992/33)
 Insolvency Fees (Amendment) Order 1992 (S.I. 1992/34)
 Non-Domestic Rates (Scotland) Regulations 1992 (S.I. 1992/35)
 Clean Air (Units of Measurement) Regulations 1992 (S.I. 1992/36)
 Taxes (Relief for Gifts) (Designated Educational Establishments) Regulations 1992 (S.I. 1992/42)
 Central Office of Information Trading Fund (Variation) Order 1992 (S.I. 1992/43)
 Watermark Disease (Local Authorities) (Amendment) Order 1992 (S.I. 1992/44)
 Sheep Scab Order 1992 (S.I. 1992/45)
 Opencast Coal (Rate of Interest on Compensation) Order 1992 (S.I. 1992/46)
 Cheshire, Derbyshire, Hereford and Worcester and Staffordshire (County Boundaries) (Variation) Order 1992 (S.I. 1992/48)
 Income-related Benefits Schemes (Miscellaneous Amendments) Regulations 1992 (S.I. 1992/50)
 Environmentally Sensitive Areas (West Penwith) Designation (Amendment) Order 1992 (S.I. 1992/51)
 Environmentally Sensitive Areas (South Downs) Designation Order 1992 (S.I. 1992/52)
 Environmentally Sensitive Areas (Somerset Levels and Moors) Designation Order 1992 (S.I. 1992/53)
 Environmentally Sensitive Areas (The Broads) Designation Order 1992 (S.I. 1992/54)
 Environmentally Sensitive Areas (Pennine Dales) Designation Order 1992 (S.I. 1992/55)
 Agricultural or Forestry Tractors and Tractor Components (Type Approval) (Fees) (Revocation) Regulations 1992 (S.I. 1992/56)
 Food Safety Act 1990 (Commencement No. 3) Order 1992 (S.I. 1992/57)
 Ports Act 1991 (Levy on Disposals of Land, etc.) Order 1992 (S.I. 1992/58)
 Veterinary Surgeons and Veterinary Practitioners (Registration) (Amendment) Regulations Order of Council 1992 (S.I. 1992/64)
 Education (School Information) (Amendment) (England) Regulations 1992 (S.I. 1992/70)
 Planning and Compensation Act 1991 (Commencement No. 6) (Scotland) Order 1992 (S.I. 1992/71)
 Smoke Control Areas (Authorised Fuels) (Amendment) Regulations 1992 (S.I. 1992/72)
 Local Government (Publication of Information About Unused and Underused Land) (England) Regulations 1992 (S.I. 1992/73)
 Criminal Justice (International Co-operation) Act 1990 (Enforcement Officers) Order 1992 (S.I. 1992/77)
 New Towns (Defects Grants) (Payments to District Councils) (Extensions of Time) (Amendment) Order 1992 (S.I. 1992/78)
 Offshore Installations (Safety Zones) Order 1992 (S.I. 1992/79)
 Agricultural or Forestry Tractors and Tractor Components (Type Approval) (Amendment) Regulations 1992 (S.I. 1992/80)
 National Health Service (Indicative Amounts) (Scotland) Regulations 1992 (S.I. 1992/81)
 Act of Sederunt (Fees of Sheriff Officers) 1992 (S.I. 1992/82)
 Agricultural or Forestry Tractors and Tractor Components (Type Approval) (Fees) Regulations 1992 (S.I. 1992/83)
 Act of Sederunt (Fees of Messengers-at-Arms) 1992 (S.I. 1992/87)
 Act of Sederunt (Rules of the Court of Session Amendment) (Optional Procedure and Miscellaneous) 1992 (S.I. 1992/88)
 Revenue Support Grant (Specified Bodies) Regulations 1992 (S.I. 1992/89)
 Gaming Act (Variation of Fees) Order 1992 (S.I. 1992/93)
 Lotteries (Gaming Board Fees) Order 1992 (S.I. 1992/94)
 Community Charges and Non-Domestic Rating (Demand Notices) (Wales) (Amendment) Regulations 1992 (S.I. 1992/96)
 Social Security (Contributions) Amendment Regulations 1992 (S.I. 1992/97)
 Merchant Shipping (Prevention of Oil Pollution) (Amendment) Regulations 1992 (S.I. 1992/98)
 Registration of Births, Deaths and Marriages (Fees) Order 1992 (S.I. 1992/99)

101-200

 Relevant Population (England) (Amendment) Regulations 1992 (S.I. 1992/108)
 Food Protection (Emergency Prohibitions) (Paralytic Shellfish Poisoning) (No. 13 Partial Revocation) Order 1992 (S.I. 1992/109)
 Education (Financial Delegation for Primary Schools) (Amendment) Regulations 1992 (S.I. 1992/110)
 Food Protection (Emergency Prohibitions) (Paralytic Shellfish Poisoning) (No. 14 Revocation) Order 1992 (S.I. 1992/111)
 Food Safety Act 1990 (Consequential Modifications) (Local Enactments) Order 1992  S.I. 1992/117)
 National Health Service (District Health Authorities) Order 1992 (S.I. 1992/119)
 National Health Service (Determination of Districts) Order 1992 (S.I. 1992/120)
 A3 Trunk Road (Stoke Junction Improvement Guildford Detrunking) Order 1992 (S.I. 1992/121)
 Land Registration (Open Register) Rules 1991 S.I. 1992/122)
 Buying Agency Trading Fund (Variation) Order 1992 (S.I. 1992/123)
 Lee Valley Water Plc (Constitution and Regulation) Order 1992 (S.I. 1992/124)
 Rickmansworth Water Plc (Constitution and Regulation) Order1992 (S.I. 1992/125)
 Revenue Support Grant (Scotland) Order 1992 (S.I. 1992/127)
 Firemen's Pension Scheme Order 1992 (S.I. 1992/129)
 Sea Fishing (Days in Port) Regulations 1992 (S.I. 1992/130)
 Chester and Halton Community National Health Service Trust (Transfer of Trust Property) Order 1992 (S.I. 1992/131)
 Epsom Health Care National Health Service Trust (Transfer of Trust Property) Order 1992 (S.I. 1992/132)
 North Middlesex Hospital National Health Service Trust (Transfer of Trust Property) Order 1992 (S.I. 1992/133)
 Royal London Hospital and Associated Community Services National Health Service Trust (Transfer of Trust Property) Order 1992 (S.I. 1992/134)
 Merchant Shipping (Cargo Ship Construction and Survey) Regulations 1984 (Amendment) Regulations 1992 (S.I. 1992/135)
 Education (National Curriculum) (Exceptions) Regulations 1992 (S.I. 1992/155)
 Education (National Curriculum) (Exceptions in History and Geography at Key Stage 4) Regulations 1992 (S.I. 1992/156)
 Education (National Curriculum) (Exceptions from Science at Key Stage 4) Regulations 1992 (S.I. 1992/157)
 Bovine Offal (Prohibition) (Scotland) Amendment Regulations 1992 (S.I. 1992/158)
 Education (Application of Financing Schemes to Special Schools) Regulations 1992 (S.I. 1992/164)
 Emulsifiers and Stabilisers in Food (Amendment) Regulations 1992 (S.I. 1992/165)
 Motor Vehicles (Driving Licences) (Large Goods and Passenger-Carrying Vehicles) (Amendment) Regulations 1992 (S.I. 1992/166)
 Food Protection (Emergency Prohibitions) (Paralytic Shellfish Poisoning) (No. 13 Revocation) Order 1992 (S.I. 1992/167)
 Lawnmowers (Harmonization of Noise Emission Standards) Regulations 1992 (S.I. 1992/168)
 The South Oxfordshire (Parishes) Order 1992 S.I. 1992/169
 Local Government Superannuation (Amendment) Regulations 1992 (S.I. 1992/172)
 Finance Act 1991, section 58, (Commencement No. 1) Regulations 1992 (S.I. 1992/173)
 A564 Trunk Road Stoke—Derby Route (Foston—Hatton—Hilton Bypass and Slip Roads) Order 1992 (S.I. 1992/174)
 A564 Trunk Road Stoke—Derby Route (Foston—Hatton—Hilton Bypass) (Detrunking) Order1992 (S.I. 1992/175)
 A564 Trunk Road (Stoke—Derby Route) (Derby Southern Bypass and Slip Roads) (No. 2) Order 1992 (S.I. 1992/176)
 A564 Trunk Road (Stoke—Derby Route) (Derby Southern Bypass, Derby Spur and Junctions) Order 1992 (S.I. 1992/177)
 A564 Trunk Road (Stoke—Derby Route) (Derby Southern Bypass) (Detrunking) (No.1) Order 1992 (S.I. 1992/178)
 A564 Trunk Road (Stoke — Derby Route) (Derby Southern Bypass and Slip Roads) (No 1) Order 1992 (S.I. 1992/179)
 A564 Trunk Road (Stoke — Derby Route) (Derby Southern Bypass) (Burnaston Slip Roads) Order 1992 (S.I. 1992/180)
 London—Carlisle—Glasgow—Inverness Trunk Road (Cavendish Bridge and Shardlow Diversion) Order 1938 (Revocation) Order 1992 (S.I. 1992/181)
 Fire Services (Appointments and Promotion) (Amendment) Regulations 1992 (S.I. 1992/187)
 City of London (Non-Domestic Rating Multiplier) Order 1992 (S.I. 1992/188)
 Sea Fishing (Enforcement of Community Quota Measures) Order 1992 (S.I. 1992/190)
 National Health Service (General Medical and Pharmaceutical Services) (Scotland) Amendment Regulations 1992 (S.I. 1992/191)
 Annual Close Time (River Findhorn Salmon Fishery District) Order 1992 (S.I. 1992/192)
 The Melton (Parishes) Order 1992 S.I. 1992/193
 Local Land Charges (Amendment) Rules 1992 (S.I. 1992/194)
 Lifting Plant and Equipment (Records of Test and Examination etc.) Regulations 1992 (S.I. 1992/195)
 Public Airport Companies (Capital Finance) (Second Amendment) Order 1992 (S.I. 1992/196)
 Stamp Duty and Stamp Duty Reserve Tax (Definition of Unit Trust Scheme) Regulations 1992 (S.I. 1992/197)
 Pensions Increase (Review) Order 1992 (S.I. 1992/198)
 Road Traffic Act 1991 (Commencement No. 2) Order 1992 (S.I. 1992/199)
 Disabled Persons (Badges for Motor Vehicles) (Amendment) Regulations 1992 (S.I. 1992/200)

201-300

 Housing Benefit (General) Amendment Regulations 1992 (S.I. 1992/201)
 Medway Ports Authority Scheme 1991 Confirmation Order 1992 (S.I. 1992/202)
 Rate Support Grant (Scotland) Order 1991 S.I. 1992/207)
 Community Charges and Non-Domestic Rating (Demand Notices) (England) Regulations 1992 (S.I. 1992/208)
 Community Charges and Non-Domestic Rating (Demand Notices) (City of London) Regulations 1992 (S.I. 1992/209)
 Personal Community Charge (Relief) (Wales) Regulations 1992 (S.I. 1992/210)
 Copyright (Certification of Licensing Scheme for Educational Recording of Broadcasts and Cable Programmes) (Educational Recording Agency Limited) (Amendment) Order 1992 (S.I. 1992/211)
 Community Charges (Administration and Enforcement) (Amendment) Regulations 1992 (S.I. 1992/219)
 Town and Country Planning (General Permitted Development) (Scotland) Order 1992 (S.I. 1992/223)
 Town and Country Planning (General Development Procedure) (Scotland) Order 1992 (S.I. 1992/224)
 Uncertificated Securities Regulations 1992 (S.I. 1992/225)
 Cayman Islands (Constitution) (Amendment) Order 1992 (S.I. 1992/226)
 Child Abduction and Custody (Parties to Conventions) Order 1992 (S.I. 1992/227)
 Foreign Compensation (Financial Provisions) Order 1992 (S.I. 1992/228)
 Merchant Shipping (Confirmation of Legislation) (Cayman Islands) Order 1992 (S.I. 1992/229)
 Civil Aviation Act 1982 (Guernsey) Order 1992 (S.I. 1992/230)
 Electricity (Northern Ireland) Order 1992 (S.I. 1992/231)
 Electricity (Northern Ireland Consequential Amendments) Order 1992 (S.I. 1992/232)
 European Parliamentary Constituencies (England) (Miscellaneous Changes) Order 1992 (S.I. 1992/233)
 Radioactive Material (Road Transport) (Northern Ireland) Order 1992 (S.I. 1992/234)
 Tourism (Northern Ireland) Order 1992 (S.I. 1992/235)
 European Parliamentary Constituencies (Scotland) (Miscellaneous Changes) Order 1992 (S.I. 1992/236)
 International Transport Conventions Act 1983 (Amendment) Order 1992 (S.I. 1992/237)
 Diseases of Animals (Approved Disinfectants) (Amendment) Order1992 (S.I. 1992/238)
 Occupational Pension Schemes (Investment of Scheme's Resources) Regulations 1992 (S.I. 1992/246)
 Social Security (Miscellaneous Provisions) Amendment Regulations 1992 (S.I. 1992/247)
 Housing Support Grant (Scotland) Order 1992 (S.I. 1992/248)
 Act of Sederunt (Amendment of Ordinary Cause, Summary Cause and Small Claim Rules) 1992 (S.I. 1992/249)
 Sea Fishing (Enforcement of Community Conservation Measures) (Amendment) Order 1992 (S.I. 1992/263)
 River Tay Salmon Fishery District (Baits and Lures) Regulations 1992 (S.I. 1992/264)
 Taxes (Interest Rate) (Amendment) Regulations 1992 (S.I. 1992/265)
 Environmental Protection Act 1990 (Commencement No. 11) Order 1992 (S.I. 1992/266)
 Hill Livestock (Compensatory Allowances) Regulations 1992 (S.I. 1992/269)
 Suckler Cow Premium (Amendment) Regulations 1992 (S.I. 1992/270)
 Land Compensation (Additional Development) (Forms) Regulations 1992 (S.I. 1992/271)
 Act of Sederunt (Judicial Factors Rules) 1992 (S.I. 1992/272)
 Financial Services Act 1986 (Extension of Scope of Act) Order 1992 (S.I. 1992/273)
 Financial Services Act 1986 (Investment Advertisements) (Exemptions) Order 1992 (S.I. 1992/274)
 Police (Amendment) Regulations 1992 (S.I. 1992/275)
 Police Cadets (Amendment) Regulations 1992 (S.I. 1992/276)
 Teachers' Superannuation (Scotland) Regulations 1992 (S.I. 1992/280)
 Broadcasting (Investment Limit in Nominated Company) Order 1992 (S.I. 1992/281)
 Borough of Basingstoke and Deane (Electoral Arrangements) Order 1992 (S.I. 1992/282)
 Customs Duties (ECSC) (Quota and other Reliefs) (Amendment) Order 1992 (S.I. 1992/283)
 Port of Tilbury Transfer Scheme 1991 Confirmation Order 1992 (S.I. 1992/284)
 A428 Trunk Road (Bedford Southern Bypass) Order 1992 (S.I. 1992/285)
 Community Charges and Non-Domestic Rating (Miscellaneous Provisions) (England) (Amendment) Regulations 1992 (S.I. 1992/286)
 Local Government Finance (Additional Grant) (England) Regulations 1992 (S.I. 1992/287)
 Environmental Protection (Stray Dogs) Regulations 1992 (S.I. 1992/288)
 Social Security Benefit (Computation of Earnings) Amendment Regulations 1992 (S.I. 1992/300)

301-400

 Environmentally Sensitive Areas (Pennine Dales) Designation (Amendment) Order 1992 (S.I. 1992/301)
 Local Authorities (Capital Finance) (Rate of Discount for 1992/93) Regulations 1992 (S.I. 1992/302)
 Gipsy Encampments (City of Cambridge) Order 1992 (S.I. 1992/303)
 Clyde Port Authority Scheme 1991 Confirmation Order 1992 (S.I. 1992/304)
 Lyon Court and Office Fees (Variation) Order 1992 (S.I. 1992/305)
 Bovine Offal (Prohibition) (Amendment) Regulations 1992 (S.I. 1992/306)
 British Railways (Penalty Fares) Act 1989 (Activating No.3) Order 1992 (S.I. 1992/307)
 Employment Protection (Variation of Limits) Order 1992 (S.I. 1992/312)
 Unfair Dismissal (Increase of Limits of Basic and Special Awards) Order 1992 (S.I. 1992/313)
 Common Agricultural Policy (Protection of Community Arrangements) Regulations 1992 (S.I. 1992/314)
 Misuse of Drugs (Licence Fees) (Amendment) Regulations 1992 (S.I. 1992/315)
 Price Indications (Bureaux de Change) Regulations 1992 (S.I. 1992/316)
 Pensions (Polish Forces) Scheme (Extension) Order 1992 (S.I. 1992/317)
 Social Security (Contributions) Amendment (No. 2) Regulations 1992 (S.I. 1992/318)
 Workmen's Compensation (Supplementation) Amendment Scheme 1992 (S.I. 1992/319)
 Wildlife and Countryside Act 1981 (Variation of Schedule) Order1992 (S.I. 1992/320)
 Costs in Criminal Cases (General) (Amendment) Regulations 1992 (S.I. 1992/323)
 Housing Act 1988 (Commencement No. 6) Order 1992 (S.I. 1992/324)
 Housing (Preservation of Right to Buy) (Scotland) Regulations 1992 (S.I. 1992/325)
 Education (London Residuary Body) (Transfer of Compensation Functions) Order 1992 (S.I. 1992/331)
 Children and Young Persons (Protection from Tobacco) Act 1991 (Commencement No. 2) Order 1992 (S.I. 1992/332)
 Criminal Justice Act 1991 (Commencement No. 3) Order 1992 (S.I. 1992/333)
 Planning and Compensation Act 1991 (Commencement No. 7 and Transitional Provisions) Order 1992 (S.I. 1992/334)
 Petty Sessional Divisions (Gwynedd) Order 1992 (S.I. 1992/335)
 Combined Probation Areas (North Wales) Order 1992 (S.I. 1992/336)
 Surface Waters (Dangerous Substances) (Classification) Regulations 1992 (S.I. 1992/337)
 National Health Service Trusts (Originating Capital Debt) Order 1992 (S.I. 1992/338)
 Trade Effluents (Prescribed Processes and Substances) Regulations 1992 (S.I. 1992/339)
 Fixed Penalty Offences Order 1992 (S.I. 1992/345)
 Fixed Penalty order 1992 (S.I. 1992/346)
 Protection of Wrecks (Designation No. 1) Order 1992 (S.I. 1992/347)
 Inner London Probation Area Order 1992 (S.I. 1992/348)
 Probation (Amendment) Rules 1992 (S.I. 1992/349)
 City of Swansea (Electoral Arrangements) Order 1992 (S.I. 1992/350)
 Road Vehicles (Construction and Use) (Amendment) Regulations 1992 (S.I. 1992/352)
 Wireless Telegraphy (Television Licence Fees) (Amendment) Regulations 1992 (S.I. 1992/353)
 New Town (Glenrothes) Winding Up Order 1992 (S.I. 1992/354)
 New Town (East Kilbride) Winding Up Order 1992 (S.I. 1992/355)
 Central Regional Council (Gartmorn Reservoir) Byelaws Extension Order 1992 (S.I. 1992/356)
 Mental Health (Detention) (Scotland) Act 1991 (Commencement) Order 1992 (S.I. 1992/357)
 Personal Community Charge (Reduction for 1992-93) (Scotland) Regulations 1992 (S.I. 1992/358)
 Building Societies (Accounts and Related Provisions) Regulations 1992 (S.I. 1992/359)
 Superannuation (Children's Pensions) (Earnings Limit) Order 1992 (S.I. 1992/360)
 Merchant Shipping (Load Lines) Act 1967 (Unregistered Ships) (Amendment) Order 1992 (S.I. 1992/361)
 Wireless Telegraphy (Licence Charges) (Amendment) Regulations 1992 (S.I. 1992/362)
 British Transport Police Force Scheme 1963 (Amendment) Order 1992 (S.I. 1992/364)
 National Health Service (Charges for Drugs and Appliances) Amendment Regulations 1992 (S.I. 1992/365)
 National Health Service (District Health Authorities) (No. 2) Order 1992 (S.I. 1992/366)
 National Health Service (Determination of Districts) (No. 2) Order 1992 (S.I. 1992/367)
 Regional and District Health Authorities (Membership and Procedure) Amendment Regulations 1992 (S.I. 1992/368)
 National Health Service (Dental Charges) Amendment Regulations 1992 (S.I. 1992/369)
 A41 Trunk Road (Brentfield Gardens, Barnet) (Prohibition of Right Turn) Order 1992 (S.I. 1992/370)
 Legal Aid (Scotland) (Fees in Civil Proceedings) Amendment Regulations 1992 (S.I. 1992/371)
 Civil Legal Aid (Scotland) (Fees) Amendment Regulations 1992 (S.I. 1992/372)
 Advice and Assistance (Scotland) Amendment Regulations 1992 (S.I. 1992/373)
 Criminal Legal Aid (Scotland) (Fees) Amendment Regulations 1992 (S.I. 1992/374)
 Recreation Grounds (Revocation of Parish Council Byelaws) Order 1992 (S.I. 1992/384)
 Removal, Storage and Disposal of Vehicles (Prescribed Sums and Charges, etc.) (Amendment) Regulations 1992 (S.I. 1992/385)
 Vehicles (Charges for Release from Immobilisation Devices) Regulations 1992 (S.I. 1992/386)
 Mid Cheshire Hospitals National Health Service Trust (Transfer of Trust Property) Order 1992 (S.I. 1992/387)
 West Dorset Community Health National Health Service Trust (Transfer of Trust Property) Order 1992 (S.I. 1992/388)
 West Dorset General Hospitals National Health Service Trust (Transfer of Trust Property) Order 1992 (S.I. 1992/389)
 West Dorset Mental Health National Health Service Trust (Transfer of Trust Property) Order 1992 (S.I. 1992/390)
 Grampian Regional Council (Spey Abstraction Scheme) Water Order 1992 (S.I. 1992/393)
 National Health Service (Charges for Drugs and Appliances) (Scotland) Amendment Regulations 1992 (S.I. 1992/394)
 Water (Prevention of Pollution) (Code of Practice) (Scotland) Order 1992 (S.I. 1992/395)
 Passenger Transport Executives (Capital Finance) (Amendment) Order 1992 (S.I. 1992/396)
 African Development Fund (Sixth Replenishment) Order 1992 (S.I. 1992/398)
 Caribbean Development Bank (Further Payments) Order 1992 (S.I. 1992/399)
 Design Right (Semiconductor Topographies) (Amendment) Regulations 1992 (S.I. 1992/400)

401-500

 Scottish Land Court (Fees) Order 1992 (S.I. 1992/401)
 Lands Tribunal for Scotland (Amendment) (Fees) Rules 1992 (S.I. 1992/402)
 Pneumoconiosis etc. (Workers' Compensation) (Payment of Claims) (Amendment) Regulations 1992 (S.I. 1992/403)
 National Health Service (Optical Charges and Payments) (Miscellaneous Amendments) Regulations 1992 (S.I. 1992/404)
 Sugar Beet (Research and Education) Order 1992 (S.I. 1992/405)
 Litter (Statutory Undertakers) (Designation and Relevant Land) (Amendment) Order 1992 (S.I. 1992/406)
 Fire Services (Appointments and Promotion) (Scotland) Amendment Regulations 1992 (S.I. 1992/409)
 Gaming Act (Variation of Fees) (Scotland) Order 1992 (S.I. 1992/410)
 National Health Service (Charges to Overseas Visitors) (Scotland) Amendment Regulations 1992 (S.I. 1992/411)
 High Court of Justiciary Fees Amendment Order 1992 (S.I. 1992/412)
 Sheriff Court Fees Amendment Order 1992 (S.I. 1992/413)
 Court of Session etc. Fees Amendment Order 1992 (S.I. 1992/414)
 Road Traffic Act 1991 (Commencement No. 3) Order 1992 (S.I. 1992/421)
 Road Vehicles (Construction and Use) (Amendment) (No. 2) Regulations 1992 (S.I. 1992/422)
 Education (Mandatory Awards) (Amendment) Regulations 1992 (S.I. 1992/423)
 Colne Valley Water Company Plc (Constitution and Regulation) Order 1992 (S.I. 1992/424)
 Amusements with Prizes (Variation of Monetary Limits) Order 1992 (S.I. 1992/425)
 Gaming Act (Variation of Monetary Limits) Order 1992 (S.I. 1992/426)
 Education (Universities Funding Council) (Supplementary Functions) Order 1992 (S.I. 1992/427)
 Education (Polytechnics and Colleges Funding Council) (Supplementary Functions) Order 1992 (S.I. 1992/428)
 Gaming Act (Variation of Monetary Limits) (No.2) Order 1992 (S.I. 1992/429)
 Gaming (Bingo) Act (Fees) (Amendment) Order 1992 (S.I. 1992/430)
 Gaming Clubs (Hours and Charges) (Amendment) Regulations 1992 (S.I. 1992/431)
 Housing Benefit and Community Charge Benefits (Miscellaneous Amendments) Regulations 1992 (S.I. 1992/432)
 Erskine Bridge Tolls Order 1992 (S.I. 1992/433)
 National Health Service (Service Committees and Tribunal) (Scotland) Regulations 1992 (S.I. 1992/434)
 Fixed Penalty (Increase) (Scotland) Order 1992 (S.I. 1992/435)
 Seeds (National Lists of Varieties) (Fees) (Amendment) Regulations 1992 (S.I. 1992/436)
 Education (London Residuary Body) (Transfer of Functions and Property) Order 1992 (S.I. 1992/437)
 Plant Breeders' Rights (Fees) (Amendment) Regulations 1992 (S.I. 1992/438)
 Insurance Companies (Amendment)Regulations 1992 (S.I. 1992/445)
 Housing Defects (Expenditure Limits) Order 1992 (S.I. 1992/446)
 Community Charges (Notices) (Substitute Charges) (England) Regulations 1992 (S.I. 1992/448)
 Pipe-lines (Metrication) Regulations 1992 (S.I. 1992/449)
 Gas (Metrication) Regulations 1992 (S.I. 1992/450)
 Insider Dealing (Recognised Stock Exchange) Order 1992 (S.I. 1992/451)
 A4 Trunk Road (Bristol City Boundary to East of Hicks Gate Roundabout) (Detrunking) Order 1992 (S.I. 1992/452)
 Diseases of Animals (Waste Food) (Fees for Licences) Order 1992 (S.I. 1992/453)
 Plant Breeders' Rights (Potatoes) (Variation) Scheme 1992 (S.I. 1992/454)
 Maintenance Enforcement Act 1991 (Commencement No. 2) Order 1992 (S.I. 1992/455)
 Family Proceedings (Amendment) Rules 1992 (S.I. 1992/456)
 Magistrates' Courts (Maintenance Enforcement Act 1991) (Miscellaneous Amendments) Rules 1992 (S.I. 1992/457)
 National Health Service (Dental Charges) (Scotland) Amendment Regulations 1992 (S.I. 1992/458)
 A23 Trunk Road (Brighton Road, Croydon) (Box Junction) Order 1992 (S.I. 1992/459)
 HIV Testing Kits and Services Regulations 1992 (S.I. 1992/460)
 Certification Officer (Amendment of Fees) Regulations 1992 (S.I. 1992/461)
 Environmental Protection (Waste Recycling Payments) Regulations 1992 (S.I. 1992/462)
 Copyright Tribunal (Amendment) Rules 1992 (S.I. 1992/467)
 Income Support (General) Amendment Regulations 1992 (S.I. 1992/468)
 Social Security Benefits Up-rating Regulations 1992 (S.I. 1992/469)
 Social Security (Invalid Care Allowance) Amendment Regulations 1992 (S.I. 1992/470)
 Vehicle Inspectorate Trading Fund (Variation) Order 1992 (S.I. 1992/471)
 Merchant Shipping (Light Dues) (Amendment) Regulations 1992 (S.I. 1992/472)
 Local Government Finance Act 1992 (Commencement No. 1) Order 1992 (S.I. 1992/473)
 Community Charges and Non-Domestic Rating (Miscellaneous Provisions) Regulations 1992 (S.I. 1992/474)
 Civil Aviation (Navigation Services Charges) (Amendment) Regulations 1992 (S.I. 1992/475)
 Employment Code of Practice (Picketing) Order 1992 (S.I. 1992/476)
 Town and Country Planning (Enforcement of Control) (Scotland) Regulations 1992 (S.I. 1992/477)
 Town and Country Planning (Special Enforcement Notices) (Scotland) Regulations 1992 (S.I. 1992/478)
 Home Energy Efficiency Grants Regulations 1992 (S.I. 1992/483)
 Wireless Telegraphy Apparatus (Low Power Devices) (Exemption)(Amendment) Regulations 1992 (S.I. 1992/484)
 Construction Plant and Equipment (Harmonisation of Noise Emission Standards) (Amendment) Regulations 1992 (S.I. 1992/488)
 Motor Vehicles (Type Approval and Approval Marks) (Fees) Regulations 1992 (S.I. 1992/489)
 Harrogate Health Care National Health Service Trust (Transfer of Trust Property) Order 1992 (S.I. 1992/492)
 Norfolk Ambulance National Health Service Trust (Transfer of Trust Property) Order 1992 (S.I. 1992/493)
 Personal Community Charge (Exemption for the Severely Mentally Impaired) Order 1992 (S.I. 1992/494)
 Prevention of Terrorism (Temporary Provisions) Act 1989 (Continuance) Order 1992 (S.I. 1992/495)
 Tin in Food Regulations 1992 (S.I. 1992/496)
 Building Societies (General Charge and Fees) Regulations 1992 (S.I. 1992/497)
 Friendly Societies (Fees) Regulations 1992 (S.I. 1992/498)
 Industrial and Provident Societies (Amendment of Fees) Regulations 1992 (S.I. 1992/499)
 Industrial and Provident Societies (Credit Unions) (Amendment of Fees) Regulations 1992 (S.I. 1992/500)

501-600

 Education (London Residuary Body) (Transfer of Loans) Order 1992 (S.I. 1992/501)
 Local Authorities (Capital Finance) (Amendment) Regulations 1992 (S.I. 1992/502)
 Personal Community Charge (Exemption for the Severely Mentally Impaired) (Scotland) Regulations 1992 (S.I. 1992/503)
 Crofter Forestry (Scotland) Act 1991 (Commencement) Order 1992 (S.I. 1992/504)
 Local Authorities Etc. (Allowances) (Scotland) Amendment Regulations 1992 (S.I. 1992/505)
 M40 (London–Oxford) Motorway (Stokenchurch to Waterstock Crossroads Section) Scheme 1970, Variation Scheme 1992 (S.I. 1992/506)
 Industrial Assurance (Fees) Regulations 1992 (S.I. 1992/508)
 Building Societies (Provision of Services) Order 1992 (S.I. 1992/509)
 Retention of Registration Marks Regulations 1992 (S.I. 1992/510)
 Lloyd's Underwriters (Tax) (1989—90) Regulations1992 (S.I. 1992/511)
 Registered Housing Associations (Accounting Requirements) Order 1992 (S.I. 1992/512)
 Young Offender Institution (Amendment) Rules 1992 (S.I. 1992/513)
 Prison (Amendment) Rules 1992 (S.I. 1992/514)
 Assured and Protected Tenancies (Lettings to Students) (Amendment) Regulations 1992 (S.I. 1992/515)
 Insurance (Fees) Regulations 1992 (S.I. 1992/516)
 Norfolk and Suffolk Broads (Extension of Byelaws) Order 1992 (S.I. 1992/517)
 Submarine Pipe-lines (Designated Owners) Order 1992 (S.I. 1992/518)
 Submarine Pipe-lines (Designated Owners) (No. 2) Order 1992 (S.I. 1992/519)
 Submarine Pipe-lines (Designated Owners) (No. 3) Order 1992 (S.I. 1992/520)
 Submarine Pipe-lines (Designated Owners) (No. 4) Order 1992 (S.I. 1992/521)
 Submarine Pipe-lines (Designated Owners) (No. 5) Order 1992 (S.I. 1992/522)
 North Tees Health National Health Service Trust (Transfer of Trust Property) Order 1992 (S.I. 1992/523)
 Social Security (Industrial Injuries) (Dependency) (Permitted Earnings Limits) Order 1992 (S.I. 1992/524)
 Milton Keynes Development Corporation (Transfer of Property and Dissolution) Order 1992 (S.I. 1992/525)
 City of Edinburgh and Midlothian Districts (Edinburgh City By-pass) Boundaries Amendment Order 1992 (S.I. 1992/526) (S. 57)
 Criminal Legal Aid (Scotland) Amendment Regulations 1992 (S.I. 1992/527)
 Advice and Assistance (Scotland) (Prospective Cost) Amendment Regulations 1992 (S.I. 1992/528)
 Act of Sederunt (Fees of Messengers-at-Arms) (Amendment) 1992 (S.I. 1992/529)
 Environmental Protection (Determination of Enforcing Authority Etc.) (Scotland) Regulations 1992 (S.I. 1992/530)
 National Health Service (Optical Charges and Payments) (Miscellaneous Amendments) (Scotland) Regulations 1992 (S.I. 1992/531)
 School Teachers' Pay and Conditions Act 1991 (Commencement No. 2 and Transitional Provision) Order 1992 (S.I. 1992/532)
 M1 London-Yorkshire Motorway (Widening Junction 9 to 10 Northbound) Connecting Roads Scheme 1992 (S.I. 1992/534)
 A249 Iwade Bypass Order 1992 (S.I. 1992/535)
 A249 Iwade Bypass (Detrunking) Order 1992 (S.I. 1992/536)
 A249 Iwade Bypass (Slip Roads) Order 1992 (S.I. 1992/537)
 Motor Vehicles (Driving Licences) (Large Goods and Passenger-Carrying Vehicles) (Amendment) (No. 2) Regulations 1992 (S.I. 1992/538)
 Motor Vehicles (Driving Licences) (Amendment) Regulations 1992 (S.I. 1992/539)
 Local Authorities (Members' Allowances) (Amendment) Regulations 1992 (S.I. 1992/540)
 Weston Area National Health Service Trust (Transfer of Trust Property) Order 1992 (S.I. 1992/541)
 Housing (Change of Landlord) (Payment of Disposal Cost by Instalments) (Amendment) Regulations 1992 (S.I. 1992/542)
 Forth Ports Authority Scheme 1992 Confirmation Order 1992 (S.I. 1992/546)
 Export of Goods (Control) (Amendment) Order 1992 (S.I. 1992/547)
 Council Tax (Discount Disregards) Order 1992 (S.I. 1992/548)
 Council Tax (Chargeable Dwellings) Order 1992 (S.I. 1992/549)
 Council Tax (Situation and Valuation of Dwellings) Regulations 1992 (S.I. 1992/550)
 Council Tax (Liability for Owners) Regulations 1992 (S.I. 1992/551)
 Council Tax (Additional Provisions for Discount Disregards) Regulations 1992 (S.I. 1992/552)
 Council Tax (Contents of Valuation Lists) Regulations 1992 (S.I. 1992/553)
 Council Tax (Reductions for Disabilities) Regulations 1992 (S.I. 1992/554)
 Education (Grant-maintained Schools) (Finance) Regulations 1992 (S.I. 1992/555)
 Non-Domestic Rating (Material Day for List Alterations) Regulations 1992 (S.I. 1992/556)
 Non-Domestic Rating (Multiple Moorings) Regulations 1992 (S.I. 1992/557)
 Council Tax (Exempt Dwellings) Order 1992 (S.I. 1992/558)
 Non-Domestic Rating (Transitional Period) (Further Provision) Regulations 1992 (S.I. 1992/559)
 Royal Liverpool Children's Hospital and Community Services National Health Service Trust (Transfer of Trust Property) Order 1992 (S.I. 1992/560)
 United Bristol Healthcare National Health Service Trust (Transfer of Trust Property) Order 1992 (S.I. 1992/561)
 Housing Renovation etc. Grants (Prescribed Forms and Particulars) (Amendment) Regulations 1992 (S.I. 1992/562)
 National Assistance (Charges for Accommodation) Regulations 1992 (S.I. 1992/563)
 Goods Vehicles (Plating and Testing) (Amendment) Regulations 1992 (S.I. 1992/564)
 Public Service Vehicles (Conditions of Fitness, Equipment, Use and Certification) (Amendment) Regulations 1992 (S.I. 1992/565)
 Motor Vehicles (Tests) (Amendment) Regulations 1992 (S.I. 1992/566)
 National Health Service and Community Care Act 1990 (Commencement No. 9) Order 1992 (S.I. 1992/567)
 Income Tax (Dealers in Securities) Regulations 1992 (S.I. 1992/568)
 Income Tax (Dividend Manufacturing) Regulations 1992  S.I. 1992/569)
 Stamp Duty and Stamp Duty Reserve Tax (Investment Exchanges and Clearing Houses) Regulations 1992 (S.I. 1992/570)
 Income Tax (Definition of Unit Trust Scheme) (Amendment) Regulations 1992 (S.I. 1992/571)
 Income Tax (Stock Lending) (Amendment) Regulations 1992 (S.I. 1992/572)
 Family Credit (General) Amendment Regulations 1992 (S.I. 1992/573)
 Surface Waters (Dangerous Substances) (Classification) (Scotland) Regulations 1992 (S.I. 1992/574)
 Private Water Supplies (Scotland) Regulations 1992 (S.I. 1992/575)
 South Eastern Police (Amalgamation) Amendment (No.2) Scheme Order 1992 (S.I. 1992/576)
 Severn Bridges Tolls Order 1992 (S.I. 1992/577)
 Severn Bridges Act 1992 (Appointed Day) Order 1992 (S.I. 1992/578)
 Severn Bridges (Designation of Staff for Transfer) Order 1992 (S.I. 1992/579)
 Nursing and Midwifery Student Allowances (Scotland) Regulations 1992 (S.I. 1992/580)
 Waltham Forest Housing Action Trust (Transfer of Property) Order 1992 (S.I. 1992/581)
 Local Government (Direct Labour Organisations) (Competition) (Exemption) (England) Regulations 1992 (S.I. 1992/582)
 Local Government Act 1988 (Defined Activities) (Exemption) (England) Order 1992 (S.I. 1992/583)
 Birmingham Heartlands Development Corporation (Area and Constitution) Order 1992 Approved by both Houses of Parliament S.I. 1992/584)
 Social Security (Invalidity Benefit and Severe Disablement Allowance) Miscellaneous Amendment Regulations 1992 (S.I. 1992/585)
 Education (London Residuary Body) (Transitional and Supplementary Provisions) Order 1992 (S.I. 1992/586)
 Education (London Residuary Body) (Property Transfer) Order1992 (S.I. 1992/587)
 Controlled Waste Regulations 1992 (S.I. 1992/588)
 Social Security (Overlapping Benefits) Amendment Regulations 1992 (S.I. 1992/589)
 Civil Legal Aid (General) (Amendment) Regulations 1992 (S.I. 1992/590)
 Legal Advice and Assistance (Amendment) Regulations 1992 (S.I. 1992/591)
 Legal Aid in Criminal and Care Proceedings (Costs) (Amendment) Regulations 1992 (S.I. 1992/592)
 Civil Courts (Amendment) Order 1992 (S.I. 1992/593)
 Legal Advice and Assistance at Police Stations (Remuneration) (Amendment) Regulations 1992 (S.I. 1992/594)
 Legal Aid in Contempt Proceedings (Remuneration) (Amendment) Regulations 1992 (S.I. 1992/595)
 Legal Aid in Family Proceedings (Remuneration) (Amendment) Regulations 1992 (S.I. 1992/596)
 Education (National Curriculum) (Attainment Targets and Programmes of Study in Music) (England) Order 1992 (S.I. 1992/597)
 Education (National Curriculum) (Attainment Targets and Programmes of Study in Art) (England) Order 1992 (S.I. 1992/598)
 Parliamentary Pensions (Amendment) Regulations 1992 (S.I. 1992/599)
 Parliamentary Contributory Pension Fund (Exchequer Contribution) Regulations 1992 (S.I. 1992/600) by the pension of exc 1900/98

601-700

 Northallerton Health Services National Health Service Trust (Transfer of Trust Property) Order 1992 (S.I. 1992/601)
 County Council of Avon (Avon Valley Bridge) Scheme 1989 Confirmation Instrument 1992 (S.I. 1992/602)
 Education (National Curriculum) (Attainment Target and Programmes of Study in Physical Education) Order 1992 (S.I. 1992/603)
 Medicines Act 1968 (Amendment) Regulations 1992 (S.I. 1992/604)
 Medicines Act 1968 (Application to Radiopharmaceutical-associated Products) Regulations 1992 (S.I. 1992/605)
 Medicines (Committee on the Review of Medicines) (Revocation) Order 1992 (S.I. 1992/606)
 Safety of Sports Grounds (Designation) Order 1992 (S.I. 1992/607)
 Diving Operations at Work (Amendment) Regulations 1992 (S.I. 1992/608)
 Town and Country Planning General Development (Amendment) Order 1992 (S.I. 1992/609)
 Town and Country Planning (Use Classes) (Amendment) Order 1992 (S.I. 1992/610)
 Non-Domestic Rating (Alteration of Lists and Appeals) (Amendment) Regulations 1992 (S.I. 1992/611)
 Local Authorities (Calculation of Council Tax Base) Regulations 1992 (S.I. 1992/612)
 Council Tax (Administration and Enforcement) Regulations 1992 (S.I. 1992/613)
 Environmental Protection (Prescribed Processes and Substances) (Amendment) Regulations 1992 (S.I. 1992/614)
 Design Right (Proceedings before Comptroller) (Amendment) Rules 1992 (S.I. 1992/615)
 Patents (Fees) Rules 1992 (S.I. 1992/616)
 Registered Designs (Fees) Rules 1992 (S.I. 1992/617)
 Local Authorities (Members' Interests) Regulations 1992 (S.I. 1992/618)
 Race Relations Code of Practice (Non-Rented Housing) Order 1992 (S.I. 1992/619)
 Collection Fund (England) (Amendment) Regulations 1992 (S.I. 1992/620)
 Birmingham Heartlands Development Corporation (Planning Functions) Order 1992 (S.I. 1992/621)
 Income Tax (Indexation) Order 1992 (S.I. 1992/622)
 Personal Equity Plan (Amendment) Regulations 1992 (S.I. 1992/623)
 Retirement Benefits Schemes (Indexation of Earnings Cap) Order 1992 (S.I. 1992/624)
 Inheritance Tax (Indexation) Order 1992 (S.I. 1992/625)
 Capital Gains Tax (Annual Exempt Amount) Order 1992 (S.I. 1992/626)
 Value Added Tax (Cars) (Amendment) Order 1992 (S.I. 1992/627)
 Value Added Tax (Charities and Aids for Handicapped Persons) Order 1992 (S.I. 1992/628)
 Value Added Tax (Increase of Registration Limits) Order 1992 (S.I. 1992/629)
 Value Added Tax (Treatment of Transactions) Order 1992 (S.I. 1992/630)
 Telecommunications Act 1984 (Government Shareholding) Order 1992 (S.I. 1992/631)
 Social Security Act 1990 (Commencement No.4) Order 1992 (S.I. 1992/632)
 Social Security (Disability Living Allowance) Amendment Regulations 1992 (S.I. 1992/633)
 Motor Vehicles (Designation of Approval Marks) (Amendment) Regulations 1992 (S.I. 1992/634)
 National Health Service (General Medical Services) Regulations 1992 (S.I. 1992/635)
 National Health Service (Fund-holding Practices) (Amendment) Regulations 1992 (S.I. 1992/636)
 Welfare Food Amendment Regulations 1992 (S.I. 1992/637)
 Rules of the Supreme Court (Amendment) 1992 (S.I. 1992/638)
 Legal Advice and Assistance (Duty Solicitor) (Remuneration) (Amendment) Regulations 1992 (S.I. 1992/639)
 Fire Service College Trading Fund Order 1992 (S.I. 1992/640)
 National Health Service (General Dental Services) (Scotland) Amendment Regulations 1992 (S.I. 1992/641)
 Non-Domestic Rates (Levying) (Scotland) Regulations 1992 (S.I. 1992/642)
 Non-Domestic Rates (No. 2) (Scotland) Regulations 1992 (S.I. 1992/643)
 Value Added Tax (Cash Accounting) (Amendment) Regulations 1992 (S.I. 1992/644)
 Value Added Tax (General) (Amendment) Regulations 1992 (S.I. 1992/645)
 Road Vehicles (Construction and Use) (Amendment) (No. 3) Regulations 1992 (S.I. 1992/646)
 Radioactive Substances (Substances of Low Activity) Exemption (Amendment) Order 1992 (S.I. 1992/647)
 Building Societies (Designation of Qualifying Bodies) Order 1992 (S.I. 1992/649)
 Building Societies (Designation of Qualifying Bodies) (No. 2) Order 1992 (S.I. 1992/650)
 Building Societies (Designation of Qualifying Bodies) (No. 3) Order 1992 (S.I. 1992/651)
 Building Societies (Designation of Qualifying Bodies) (No. 4) Order 1992 (S.I. 1992/652)
 Collection Fund (Wales) (Amendment) Regulations 1992 (S.I. 1992/653)
 Financial Assistance for Environmental Purposes (England and Wales) Order 1992 (S.I. 1992/654)
 Dental Practice Board Regulations 1992 (S.I. 1992/655)
 Planning (Hazardous Substances) Regulations 1992 (S.I. 1992/656)
 Town and Country Planning (Use Classes) (Amendment) (No. 2) Order 1992 (S.I. 1992/657)
 Town and Country Planning General Development (Amendment) (No. 2) Order 1992 (S.I. 1992/658)
 National Health Service Functions (Administration Arrangements and Amendment of Directions) Regulations 1992 (S.I. 1992/659)
 National Health Service (Appellate and Other Functions) Regulations 1992 (S.I. 1992/660)
 National Health Service (General Dental Services) Regulations 1992 (S.I. 1992/661)
 National Health Service (Pharmaceutical Services) Regulations 1992 (S.I. 1992/662)
 Community Charges (Administration and Enforcement) (Attachment of Earnings Order) (Wales) Regulations 1992 (S.I. 1992/663)
 National Health Service (Service Committees and Tribunal) Regulations 1992 (S.I. 1992/664)
 Planning and Compensation Act 1991 (Commencement No. 8) Order 1992 (S.I. 1992/665)
 Town and Country Planning (Control of Advertisements) Regulations 1992 (S.I. 1992/666)
 Social Security (Contributions) Amendment (No. 3) Regulations 1992 (S.I. 1992/667)
 Social Security (Contributions) Amendment (No. 4) Regulations 1992 (S.I. 1992/668)
 Social Security (Contributions) Amendment (No. 5) Regulations 1992 (S.I. 1992/669)
 Sea Fishing (Days in Port) (Amendment) Regulations 1992 (S.I. 1992/670)
 Artificial Insemination of Cattle (Animal Health) (England and Wales) (Amendment) Regulations 1992 (S.I. 1992/671)
 Common Agricultural Policy (Wine) Regulations 1992 (S.I. 1992/672)
 A38, A40 and A417 Trunk Roads (Gloucester City) (Detrunking) Order 1992 (S.I. 1992/673)
 A1 Trunk Road (Haringey) Red Route Experimental Traffic Order 1992 (S.I. 1992/685)
 A1 Trunk Road (Haringey) (Bus Lanes) Red Route Experimental Traffic Order 1992 (S.I. 1992/686)
 A1 Trunk Road (Islington) (Bus Lanes) Red Route Experimental Traffic Order 1992 (S.I. 1992/687)
 Burning of Crop Residues (Repeal of Byelaws) Order 1992 (S.I. 1992/693)
 Medicines (Fees Relating to Medicinal Products for Animal Use) Regulations 1992 (S.I. 1992/694)
 Oilseeds Producers (Support System) Regulations 1992 (S.I. 1992/695)
 Veterinary Surgery (Epidural Anaesthesia) Order 1992 (S.I. 1992/696)
 Levying Bodies (General) (Amendment) Regulations 1992 (S.I. 1992/697)
 Valuation for Rating (Former Enterprise Zones) (Amendment) Regulations 1992 (S.I. 1992/698)
 A1 Trunk Road (Islington) Red Route Experimental Traffic Order 1992 (S.I. 1992/699)
 National Assistance (Charges for Accommodation) (Scotland) Regulations 1992 (S.I. 1992/700)

701-800

 Housing Benefit and Community Charge Benefit (Subsidy) Amendment Regulations 1992 (S.I. 1992/701)
 Personal Injuries (Civilians) Amendment Scheme 1992 (S.I. 1992/702)
 Social Security (Attendance Allowance) Amendment Regulations 1992 (S.I. 1992/703)
 Social Security (Severe Disablement Allowance) Amendment Regulations 1992 (S.I. 1992/704)
 Housing Renovation etc. Grants (Reduction of Grant) (Amendment) Regulations 1992 (S.I. 1992/705)
 Representation of the People (Variation of Limits of Candidates' Election Expenses) Order 1992 (S.I. 1992/706)
 European Communities (Designation) Order 1992 (S.I. 1992/707)
 Football Spectators (Corresponding Offences in Sweden) Order 1992 (S.I. 1992/708)
 Transfer of Functions (Magistrates' Courts and Family Law) Order 1992 (S.I. 1992/709)
 Naval, Military and Air Forces etc. (Disablement and Death) Service Pensions Amendment Order 1992 (S.I. 1992/710)
 Gas Appliances (Safety) Regulations 1992 (S.I. 1992/711)
 Telecommunication Meters (Approval Fees) (British Approvals Board for Telecommunications) Order 1992 (S.I. 1992/712)
 Passenger and Goods Vehicles (Recording Equipment) (Approval of Fitters and Workshops) (Fees) (Amendment) Regulations 1992 (S.I. 1992/713)
 International Carriage of Dangerous Goods by Road (Fees) (Amendment) Regulations 1992 (S.I. 1992/714)
 International Transport of Goods under Cover of TIR Carnets (Fees) (Amendment) Regulations 1992 (S.I. 1992/715)
 Financial Markets and Insolvency (Amendment) Regulations 1992 (S.I. 1992/716)
 Returning Officers' Charges Order 1992 (S.I. 1992/717)
 Civil Legal Aid (Assessment of Resources) (Amendment) Regulations 1992 (S.I. 1992/718)
 Legal Advice and Assistance (Amendment) (No. 2) Regulations 1992 (S.I. 1992/719)
 Legal Aid in Criminal and Care Proceedings (General) (Amendment) Regulations 1992 (S.I. 1992/720)
 Civil Legal Aid (General) (Amendment) (No. 2) Regulations 1992 (S.I. 1992/721)
 Representation of the People (Amendment) Regulations 1992 (S.I. 1992/722)
 European Parliamentary Elections (Amendment) Regulations 1992 (S.I. 1992/723)
 Public Trustee (Fees) (Amendment) Order 1992 (S.I. 1992/724)
 Planning (Hazardous Substances) Act 1990 (Commencement and Transitional Provisions) Order 1992 (S.I. 1992/725)
 Social Security (Credits) Amendment Regulations 1992 (S.I. 1992/726)
 Criminal Justice Act 1991 (Suspension of Prisoner Custody Officer Certificate) Regulations 1992 (S.I. 1992/727)
 Social Security (Introduction of Disability Living Allowance) Miscellaneous Amendments Regulations 1992 (S.I. 1992/728)
 Magistrates' Courts (Miscellaneous Amendments) Rules 1992 (S.I. 1992/729)
 Returning Officer's Charges (Northern Ireland) Order 1992 (S.I. 1992/730)
 Income Tax (Cash Equivalents of Car Benefits) Order 1992 (S.I. 1992/731)
 Income Tax (Cash Equivalents of Car Fuel Benefits) Order 1992 (S.I. 1992/732)
 Value Added Tax (Increase of Consideration for Fuel) Order 1992 (S.I. 1992/733)
 Vocational Training (Public Financial Assistance and Disentitlement to Tax Relief) Regulations 1992 (S.I. 1992/734)
 Education (Student Loans) (Amendment) Regulations 1992 (S.I. 1992/735)
 Pensions Increase (Judicial Pensions) (Amendment) Regulations 1992 (S.I. 1992/736)
 Price Indications (Bureaux de Change) (No.2) Regulations 1992 (S.I. 1992/737)
 Local Authorities (Capital Finance) (Amendment) Regulations 1992 (S.I. 1992/738)
 Housing Benefit and Community Charge Benefit (Subsidy) Order 1992 (S.I. 1992/739)
 Building (Approved Inspectors etc.) (Amendment) Regulations 1992 (S.I. 1992/740)
 Building (Prescribed Fees etc.) (Amendment) Regulations S.I. 1992/741)
 Road Traffic (Carriage of Dangerous Substances in Packages etc.) Regulations 1992 (S.I. 1992/742)
 Road Traffic (Carriage of Dangerous Substances in Road Tankers and Tank Containers) Regulations 1992 (S.I. 1992/743)
 Road Traffic (Training of Drivers of Vehicles Carrying Dangerous Goods) Regulations 1992 (S.I. 1992/744)
 Civil Jurisdiction and Judgments Act 1991 (Commencement) Order 1992 (S.I. 1992/745)
 Vocational Training (Tax Relief) Regulations 1992 (S.I. 1992/746)
 Motor Vehicles (Competitions and Trials) (Scotland) Amendment Regulations 1992 (S.I. 1992/747)
 Act of Sederunt (Fees of Solicitors in the Sheriff Court) (Amendment) 1992 (S.I. 1992/748)
 Amusements with Prizes (Variation of Monetary Limits) (Scotland) Order 1992 (S.I. 1992/749)
 Gaming Clubs (Hours and Charges) (Scotland) Amendment Regulations 1992 (S.I. 1992/750)
 Gaming Act (Variation of Monetary Limits) (Scotland) Order 1992 (S.I. 1992/751)
 Advice and Assistance (Scotland) Amendment (No.2) Regulations 1992 (S.I. 1992/752)
 Civil Legal Aid (Scotland) Amendment Regulations 1992 (S.I. 1992/753)
 National Health Service (Travelling Expenses and Remission of Charges) (Scotland) Amendment Regulations 1992 (S.I. 1992/754)
 Medicines (Applications for Grant and Renewal of Licences) (Miscellaneous Amendments) Regulations 1992 (S.I. 1992/755)
 Medicines (Products for Human Use– Fees) Amendment Regulations 1992 (S.I. 1992/756)
 Education (National Curriculum) (Attainment Targets and Programmes of Study in Art) (Wales) Order 1992 (S.I. 1992/757)
 Education (National Curriculum) (Attainment Targets and Programmes of Study in Music) (Wales) Order 1992 (S.I. 1992/758)
 Housing Renovation etc. Grants (Prescribed Forms and Particulars) (Welsh Forms and Particulars) (Amendment) Regulations 1992 (S.I. 1992/759)
 Local Government and Housing Act 1989 (Commencement No. 14) Order 1992 (S.I. 1992/760)
 Measuring Instruments (EEC Requirements) (Fees) (Amendment) Regulations 1992 (S.I. 1992/761)
 Aggravated Vehicle-Taking Act 1992 (Commencement) Order 1992 (S.I. 1992/764)
 Weights and Measures Act 1985 (Commencement) Order 1992 (S.I. 1992/770)
 Loch Awe and Associated Waters Protection Order 1992 (S.I. 1992/771)
 Highlands and Islands Rural Enterprise Programme (Amendment) Regulations 1992 (S.I. 1992/772)
 Act of Sederunt (Fees of Sheriff Officers) (Amendment) 1992 (S.I. 1992/773)
 Customs Duties (ECSC) (Amendment No. 7) Order 1992 (S.I. 1992/792)
 County Court (Amendment) Rules 1992 (S.I. 1992/793)
 County Court (Forms)(Amendment) Rules 1992 (S.I. 1992/794)
 Social Security (Class 1 Contributions – Contracted-out Percentages) Order 1992 (S.I. 1992/795)
 State Scheme Premiums (Actuarial Tables) Regulations 1992 (S.I. 1992/796)
 Statutory Sick Pay (Small Employers' Relief) Amendment Regulations 1992 (S.I. 1992/797)
 Act of Sederunt (Coal Mining Subsidence Act 1991) 1992 (S.I. 1992/798)
 National Health Service and Community Care Act 1990 (Commencement No. 3 and Transitional Provisions) (Scotland) (Amendment) Order 1992 (S.I. 1992/799)
 Foresterhill Hospitals National Health Service Trust (Establishment) Amendment Order 1992 (S.I. 1992/800)

801-900

 South Ayrshire Hospitals National Health Service Trust (Establishment) Amendment Order 1992 (S.I. 1992/801)
 Admiralty Jurisdiction (British Indian Ocean Territory) (Amendment) Order 1992 (S.I. 1992/802)
 Child Abduction and Custody (Parties to Conventions) (Amendment) Order 1992 (S.I. 1992/803)
 Medical Qualifications (Amendment) Act 1991 (Commencement) Order 1992 (S.I. 1992/804)
 Appropriation (Northern Ireland) Order 1992 (S.I. 1992/805)
 Civil Aviation Act 1982 (Guernsey) (Amendment) Order 1992 (S.I. 1992/806)
 Industrial Relations (Northern Ireland) Order 1992 (S.I. 1992/807)
 Industrial Relations (Northern Ireland Consequential Amendment) Order 1992 (S.I. 1992/808)
 Local Elections (Northern Ireland) (Amendment) Order 1992 (S.I. 1992/809)
 Local Government (Miscellaneous Provisions) (Northern Ireland) Order 1992 (S.I. 1992/810)
 Registration (Land and Deeds) (Northern Ireland) Order 1992 (S.I. 1992/811)
 Social Security (Barbados) Order 1992 (S.I. 1992/812)
 Financial Services Act 1986 (Investment Advertisements) (Exemptions) (No. 2) Order 1992 (S.I. 1992/813)
 Education (School Teachers' Pay and Conditions) Order 1992 (S.I. 1992/814)
 Land Registration (Scotland) Act 1979 (Commencement No. 5) Order 1992 (S.I. 1992/815)
 Commonwealth Development Corporation (Raising of Limits on Borrowing and Advances) Order 1992 (S.I. 1992/816)
 Further and Higher Education (Scotland) Act 1992 (Commencement No.1 and Saving Provisions) Order 1992 (S.I. 1992/817)
 Local Government Finance Act 1992 (Commencement No. 2) Order 1992 (S.I. 1992/818)
 Licensing (Amendment) (Scotland) Act 1992 (Commencement and Savings) Order 1992 (S.I. 1992/819)
 Further and Higher Education Act 1992 (Commencement No. 1 and Transitional Provisions) Order 1992 (S.I. 1992/831)
 Representation of the People (Northern Ireland) (Amendment) Regulations 1992 (S.I. 1992/832)
 European Parliamentary Elections (Northern Ireland) (Amendment) Regulations 1992 (S.I. 1992/833)
 Representation of the People (Scotland) Amendment Regulations 1992 (S.I. 1992/834)
 Petty Sessional Divisions (Oxfordshire) Order 1992 (S.I. 1992/838)
 Petty Sessional Divisions (Essex) Order 1992 (S.I. 1992/839)
 Combined Probation Areas (Oxfordshire) Order 1992 (S.I. 1992/840)
 Combined Probation Areas (Essex) Order 1992 (S.I. 1992/841)
 Magistrates' Courts Fees (Amendment) Order 1992 (S.I. 1992/842)
 Food Protection (Emergency Prohibitions) (Dioxins) (England) Order 1992 (S.I. 1992/849)
 A12 Trunk Road (Eastern Avenue East and Eastern Avenue West, Havering) (Prescribed Routes) Order 1992 (S.I. 1992/858)
 A23 Trunk Road (Foxley Lane, Croydon) (Prohibition of Right Turn) Order 1992 (S.I. 1992/859)
 Industrial and Freight Transport (Rateable Values) (Scotland) Order 1992 (S.I. 1992/864)
 Mines and Quarries (Rateable Values) (Scotland) Order 1992 (S.I. 1992/865)
 Submarine Pipe-lines (Designated Owners) (No. 6) Order 1992 (S.I. 1992/890)
 Act of Sederunt (Rules of the Court of Session Amendment No.2) (Solicitors' Fees) 1992 (S.I. 1992/894)
 A16 Trunk Road (Great Grimsby Borough Boundary to Toll Bar Roundabout) (Detrunking) Order 1990 Amendment Order 1992 (S.I. 1992/895)
 Clackmannan District Council (Vesting of Central Regional Council Land) (Scotland) Order 1991 S.I. 1992/900)

901-1000

 Control of Dogs Order 1992 (S.I. 1992/901)
 Palace of Westminster (Appointed Day) Order 1992 (S.I. 1992/902)
 Farm Woodland Premium Scheme 1992 (S.I. 1992/905)
 Combined Probation Areas (Leicestershire) Order 1992 (S.I. 1992/916)
 Dart Valley Light Railway Plc (Totnes and Ashburton) Light Railway (Transfer) Order 1992 (S.I. 1992/926)
 Community Charges and Non-Domestic Rating (Demand Notices) (Wales) (Amendment) (No. 2) Regulations 1992 (S.I. 1992/935)
 Common Agricultural Policy (Wine) (Amendment) Regulations 1992 (S.I. 1992/937)
 (A50) Nottingham–Derby–Stoke-on-Trent Trunk Road (Blythe Bridge to Queensway and Connecting Roads) Order 1992 (S.I. 1992/938)
 Libya (United Nations Prohibition of Flights) Order 1992 (S.I. 1992/973)
 Libya (United Nations Prohibition of Flights) (Dependent Territories) Order 1992 (S.I. 1992/974)
 Libya (United Nations Sanctions) Order 1992 (S.I. 1992/975)
 Libya (United Nations Sanctions) (Dependent Territories) Order 1992 (S.I. 1992/976)
 Libya (United Nations Sanctions) (Channel Islands) Order 1992 (S.I. 1992/977)
 Newcastle and Gateshead and Sunderland and South Shields Water (Amendment of Local Enactments) Order 1992 (S.I. 1992/978)
 School Teachers' Pay and Conditions Act 1991 (Commencement No. 3) Order 1992 (S.I. 1992/988)
 Education (School Teachers' Pay and Conditions) (No. 2) Order 1992 (S.I. 1992/989)
 Shetland Islands Area (Electoral Arrangements) Order 1992 (S.I. 1992/995) (S. 95)
 Highland Regional Council (Abhainn Mhungasdail) Water Order 1992 (S.I. 1992/998)

1001-1100

 Liquor Licensing (Fees) (Scotland) Variation Order 1992 (S.I. 1992/1011)
 Seed Potatoes (Fees) (Scotland) Regulations 1992 (S.I. 1992/1022)
 Electricity (Restrictive Trade Practices Act 1976) (Exemptions) Order 1992 (S.I. 1992/1024)
 Designation of Institutions of Higher Education (Scotland) Order 1992 (S.I. 1992/1025)
 Social Security (Claims and Payments) Amendment Regulations 1992 (S.I. 1992/1026)
 Limited Partnerships (Unrestricted Size) No. 3 Regulations 1992 (S.I. 1992/1027)
 Partnerships (Unrestricted Size) No. 9 Regulations 1992 (S.I. 1992/1028)
 A40 Trunk Road (Sandhills) Detrunking Order 1992 (S.I. 1992/1029)
 M1 Motorway (Junction 1 Improvement) Connecting Road Scheme 1992 (S.I. 1992/1030)
 Seed Potatoes (Amendment) Regulations 1992 (S.I. 1992/1031)
 Teignmouth Harbour Revision Order 1992 (S.I. 1992/1049)
 Petty Sessional Divisions (Humberside) Order 1992 (S.I. 1992/1057)
 Income Tax (Employments) (No. 22) Regulations 1992 (S.I. 1992/1059)
 Income Tax (Sub-contractors in the Construction Industry) (Amendment) Regulations 1992 (S.I. 1992/1065)
 Trade Marks and Service Marks (Fees) Rules 1992 (S.I. 1992/1069)
 Act of Sederunt (Adoption of Children) (Amendment) 1992 (S.I. 1992/1076)
 Act of Sederunt (Applications under Part III of the Criminal Justice (International Co-operation) Act 1990) 1992 (S.I. 1992/1077)
 Town and Country Planning (General Permitted Development) (Scotland) Amendment Order 1992 (S.I. 1992/1078)
 Combined Probation Areas (Humberside) Order 1992 (S.I. 1992/1082)
 Companies Act 1985 (Welsh Language Accounts) Regulations 1992 (S.I. 1992/1083)
 Sea Fishing (Enforcement of Community Conservation Measures) (Amendment) (No.2) Order 1992 (S.I. 1992/1084)
 Seeds (Fees) (Amendment) Regulations 1992 (S.I. 1992/1085)
 Education (Individual Pupils' Achievements, School Records and School Curriculum) (Amendment) Regulations 1992 (S.I. 1992/1089)
 Kent County Council (Royal Military Canal Bridge—Hamstreet) Scheme 1990 Confirmation Instrument 1992 (S.I. 1992/1091)
 Paisley College of Technology Scheme (Amendment) Regulations 1992 (S.I. 1992/1093)
 Education (Grant-maintained Schools) (Finance) (Amendment) Regulations 1992 (S.I. 1992/1095)
 Spray Irrigation (Definition) Order 1992 (S.I. 1992/1096)
 A19 Trunk Road (Easingwold Bypass) Order 1992 (S.I. 1992/1097)
 A19 Trunk Road (Raskelf Bridge to Shires Bridge) (Detrunking) Order 1992 (S.I. 1992/1098)

1101-1200

 Income-related Benefits Schemes and Social Security (Recoupment) Amendment Regulations 1992 (S.I. 1992/1101)
 Social Security Revaluation of Earnings Factors Order 1992 (S.I. 1992/1102)
 National Health Service (Travelling Expenses and Remission of Charges) Amendment Regulations 1992 (S.I. 1992/1104)
 Cholsey and Wallingford Light Railway (Extension and Amendment) Order 1992 (S.I. 1992/1113)
 A23 Trunk Road (Purley Way, Croydon) (Prohibition of U-Turns) Order 1992 (S.I. 1992/1114)
 Merger Situation (Medicopharma NV and AAH Holdings plc) (Interim Provision) Order 1992 (S.I. 1992/1115)
 Social Security Commissioners Procedure (Amendment) Regulations 1992 (S.I. 1992/1121)
 Imported Food (Safeguards against Paralytic Toxin) (Pectinidae from Japan) Regulations 1992 (S.I. 1992/1122)
 First Community National Health Service Trust (Transfer of Trust Property) Order 1992 (S.I. 1992/1127)
 Mental Health Foundation of Mid Staffordshire National Health Service Trust (Transfer of Trust Property) Order 1992 (S.I. 1992/1128)
 South Devon Health Care National Health Service Trust (Transfer of Trust Property) Order 1992 (S.I. 1992/1129)
 Wirral Hospital National Health Service Trust (Transfer of Trust Property) Order 1992 (S.I. 1992/1130)
 A421 Road (M1 Motorway (Junction 13) to South Bedford) Order 1992 (S.I. 1992/1135)
 Harwich Parkeston Quay Harbour Revision Order 1992 (S.I. 1992/1136)
 Patents (Amendment) Rules 1992 (S.I. 1992/1142)
 Protection of Wrecks (Designation No.3) Order 1992 (S.I. 1992/1151)
 Milk Quota (Calculation of Standard Quota) (Scotland) Amendment Order 1992 (S.I. 1992/1152)
 Export of Goods (Control) (Amendment No. 2) Order 1992 (S.I. 1992/1154)
 Education (Schools) Act 1992 (Commencement No. 1) Order 1992 (S.I. 1992/1157)
 Tay River Purification Board (Establishment) Variation Order 1992 (S.I. 1992/1159)
 Tweed River Purification Board (Establishment) Variation Order 1992 (S.I. 1992/1160)
 Solway River Purification Board (Establishment) Variation Order 1992 (S.I. 1992/1161)
 Forth River Purification Board (Establishment) Variation Order 1992 (S.I. 1992/1162)
 North East River Purification Board (Establishment) Variation Order 1992 (S.I. 1992/1163)
 Highland River Purification Board (Establishment) Variation Order 1992 (S.I. 1992/1164)
 Clyde River Purification Board (Establishment) Variation Order 1992 (S.I. 1992/1165)
 Education (Further and Higher Education Institutions Access Funds) (Amendment) Regulations 1992 (S.I. 1992/1166)
 London Cab Order 1992 (S.I. 1992/1169)
 A12 Trunk Road (Eastern Avenue West and Eastern Avenue East, Havering) (40 mph Speed Limit) Order 1992 (S.I. 1992/1170)
 Building Regulations (Amendment) Regulations 1992 (S.I. 1992/1180)
 Northern Ireland (Emergency Provisions) Act 1991 (Commencement) Order 1992 (S.I. 1992/1181)
 Academic Awards and Distinctions (Scotland) Order of Council 1992 (S.I. 1992/1189)
 Gas Transit (EEC Requirements) Regulations 1992 (S.I. 1992/1190)
 Artificial Insemination of Cattle (Animal Health) (Scotland) Amendment Regulations 1992 (S.I. 1992/1192)
 A65 and A660 Trunk Roads (Burley-in-Wharfedale Bypass) Order 1992 (S.I. 1992/1194)
 A65 and A660 Trunk Roads (Burley-in-Wharfedale) (Detrunking) Order 1992 (S.I. 1992/1195)
 Company and Business Names (Amendment) Regulations 1992 (S.I. 1992/1196)
 European Parliamentary (United Kingdom Representatives) Pensions (Amendment) Order 1992 (S.I. 1992/1197)
 Income Support (General) Amendment (No.2) Regulations 1992 (S.I. 1992/1198)
 Horses (Protective Headgear for Young Riders) Act 1990 (Commencement) Order 1992 (S.I. 1992/1200)

1201-1300

 Horses (Protective Headgear for Young Riders) Regulations 1992 (S.I. 1992/1201)
 Water (Timetable) (Scotland) Regulations 1992 (S.I. 1992/1202)
 Council Water Charge (Scotland) Regulations 1992 (S.I. 1992/1203)
 Police Cadets (Scotland) Amendment Regulations 1992 (S.I. 1992/1204)
 Education (Individual Pupils' Achievements) (Information) (Wales) Regulations 1992 (S.I. 1992/1205)
 Private Legislation Procedure (Scotland) General Order 1992 (S.I. 1992/1206)
 Severn Bridges (Description of Vehicles) Order 1992 (S.I. 1992/1207)
 Milk (Special Designation) Regulations (Amendment) Order 1992 (S.I. 1992/1208)
 Road Traffic Offenders (Prescribed Devices) Order 1992 (S.I. 1992/1209)
 Suckler Cow Premium (Amendment No. 2) Regulations 1992 (S.I. 1992/1210)
 Education (Student Loans) Regulations 1992 (S.I. 1992/1211)
 Undersized Whiting Order 1992 (S.I. 1992/1212)
 Road Traffic (Carriage of Dangerous Goods and Substances) (Amendment) Regulations 1992 (S.I. 1992/1213)
 Folkestone and District Water Company (Constitution and Regulation) Order 1992 (S.I. 1992/1214)
 Road Traffic (Temporary Restrictions) Procedure Regulations 1992 (S.I. 1992/1215)
 Tramcars and Trolley Vehicles (Modification of Enactments) Regulations 1992 (S.I. 1992/1217)
 Road Traffic (Temporary Restrictions) Act 1991 (Commencement) Order 1992 (S.I. 1992/1218)
 Local Government Superannuation (Reserve Forces) (Scotland) Regulations 1992 (S.I. 1992/1220)
 Courts and Legal Services Act 1990 (Commencement No.8) Order 1992 (S.I. 1992/1221)
 Eastbourne Hospitals National Health Service Trust (Transfer of Trust Property) Order 1992 (S.I. 1992/1222)
 Gatwick Airport London (Cargo Area Designation) Order 1992 (S.I. 1992/1223)
 Manchester International Airport (Cargo Area Designation) Order 1992 (S.I. 1992/1224)
 Milk Quota (Calculation of Standard Quota) (Amendment) Order 1992 (S.I. 1992/1225)
 Legal Aid (Scotland) Act 1986 (Commencement No. 3) Order 1992 (S.I. 1992/1226)
 Legal Aid in Contempt of Court Proceedings (Scotland) Regulations 1992 (S.I. 1992/1227)
 Legal Aid in Contempt of Court Proceedings (Scotland) (Fees) Regulations 1992 (S.I. 1992/1228)
 Protection of Wrecks (Designation No. 2) Order 1992 (S.I. 1992/1229)
 Court of Session etc. Fees Amendment (No. 2) Order 1992 (S.I. 1992/1230)
 Tayside Regional Council (Backwater and Lintrathen Reservoirs) Byelaws Extension Order 1992 (S.I. 1992/1231)
 Home-Grown Cereals Authority (Rate of Levy) Order 1992 (S.I. 1992/1233)
 A40 Trunk Road (Western Avenue, Hillingdon) (Prohibition of Use of Gap in Central Reservation) Order 1992 (S.I. 1992/1252)
 Control of Gold, Securities, Payments and Credits (Serbia and Montenegro) Directions 1992 (S.I. 1992/1265)
 Brechin and Bridge of Dun Light Railway Order 1992 (S.I. 1992/1267)
 Manchester Ship Canal Harbour Revision Order 1992 (S.I. 1992/1268)
 Education (Mandatory Awards) Regulations 1992 (S.I. 1992/1270)
 Local Government Act 1988 (Defined Activities) (Exemption) (Cambridge City Council) Order 1992 (S.I. 1992/1271)
 Export of Goods (Control) (Serbia and Montenegro Sanctions) Order 1992 (S.I. 1992/1272)
 Food Protection (Emergency Prohibitions) (Dioxins) (England) (No. 2) Order 1992 (S.I. 1992/1274)
 Statute Law (Repeals) Act 1989 (Commencement) Order 1992 (S.I. 1992/1275)
 Royal Cornwall Hospitals and West Cornwall Hospital National Health Service Trust (Change of Name) Order 1992 (S.I. 1992/1276)
 Police (Amendment) (No. 2) Regulations 1992 (S.I. 1992/1278)
 Planning and Compensation Act 1991 (Commencement No. 9 and Transitional Provision) Order 1992 (S.I. 1992/1279)
 Town and Country Planning General Development (Amendment) (No. 3) Order 1992 (S.I. 1992/1280)
 Walsall Hospitals National Health Service Trust (Transfer of Trust Property) Order 1992 (S.I. 1992/1281)
 Free Zone (Port of Tilbury) Designation Order 1992 (S.I. 1992/1282)
 Motor Vehicles (Third Party Risks) (Amendment) Regulations 1992 (S.I. 1992/1283)
 Motor Vehicles (Third-Party Risks Deposits) Regulations 1992 (S.I. 1992/1284)
 Road Vehicles (Prohibition) Regulations 1992 (S.I. 1992/1285)
 Road Traffic Act 1991 (Commencement No 4 and Transitional Provisions) Order 1992 (S.I. 1992/1286)
 Merchant Shipping (Ministry of Defence Commercially Managed Ships) Order 1992 (S.I. 1992/1293)
 Merchant Shipping (Ministry of Defence Yachts) Order 1992 (S.I. 1992/1294)
 Education (Chief Inspector of Schools in England) Order 1992 (S.I. 1992/1295)
 Transfer of Functions (Science) Order 1992 (S.I. 1992/1296)
 Transfer of Functions (Small Businesses) Order 1992 (S.I. 1992/1297)
 Arms Control and Disarmament (Privileges and Immunities) Act 1988 (Overseas Territories) Order 1992 (S.I. 1992/1298)
 Child Abduction and Custody (Parties to Conventions) (Amendment) (No. 2) Order 1992 (S.I. 1992/1299)
 Extradition (British Antarctic Territory) (Commonwealth Countries, Colonies and Republic of Ireland) Order 1992 (S.I. 1992/1300)

1301-1400

 The Official Secrets Act 1989 (Hong Kong) Order 1992 (S.I. 1992/1301)
 Serbia and Montenegro (United Nations Sanctions) Order 1992 (S.I. 1992/1302)
 Serbia and Montenegro (United Nations Sanctions) (Dependent Territories) Order 1992 (S.I. 1992/1303)
 Serbia and Montenegro (United Nations Prohibition of Flights) Order 1992 (S.I. 1992/1304)
 Serbia and Montenegro (United Nations Prohibition of Flights) (Dependent Territories) Order 1992 (S.I. 1992/1305)
 Copyright (Isle of Man) (Revocation) Order 1992 (S.I. 1992/1306)
 Home Loss Payments (Northern Ireland) Order 1992 (S.I. 1992/1307)
 Serbia and Montenegro (United Nations Sanctions) (Channel Islands) Order 1992 (S.I. 1992/1308)
 Social Security (Mortgage Interest Payments) (Northern Ireland) Order 1992 (S.I. 1992/1309)
 Still-Birth (Definition) (Northern Ireland) Order 1992 (S.I. 1992/1310)
 Transfer of Functions (National Heritage) Order 1992 (S.I. 1992/1311)
 Social Security (Australia) Order 1992 (S.I. 1992/1312)
 Copyright (Application to the Isle of Man) Order 1992 (S.I. 1992/1313)
 Transfers of Functions (Energy) Order 1992 (S.I. 1992/1314)
 Transfer of Functions (Financial Services) Order 1992 (S.I. 1992/1315)
 Transfer of Functions (Inner City Task Forces) Order 1992 (S.I. 1992/1316)
 Motor Vehicles (Driving Licences) (Amendment) (No. 2) Regulations 1992 (S.I. 1992/1318)
 Friendly Societies Act 1992 (Commencement No. 1) Order 1992 (S.I. 1992/1325)
 Income-Related Benefits Amendment Regulations 1992 (S.I. 1992/1326)
 Devon Ambulance Service National Health Service Trust (Establishment) Amendment Order 1992 (S.I. 1992/1327)
 Housing (Disapplication of Financial Hardship Provision for Repairs Grant) (Scotland) Order 1992 (S.I. 1992/1328)
 Council Tax (Valuation of Dwellings) (Scotland) Regulations 1992 (S.I. 1992/1329)
 Council Tax (Contents of Valuation Lists) (Scotland) Regulations 1992 (S.I. 1992/1330)
 Council Tax (Liability of Owners) (Scotland) Regulations 1992 (S.I. 1992/1331)
 Council Tax (Administration and Enforcement) (Scotland) Regulations 1992 (S.I. 1992/1332)
 Council Tax (Exempt Dwellings) (Scotland) Order 1992 (S.I. 1992/1333)
 Council Tax (Dwellings) (Scotland) Regulations 1992 (S.I. 1992/1334)
 Council Tax (Reductions for Disabilities) (Scotland) Regulations 1992 (S.I. 1992/1335)
 Sexual Offences (Amendment) Act 1992 (Commencement) Order 1992 (S.I. 1992/1336)
 Taxes (Interest Rate) (Amendment No. 2) Regulations 1992 (S.I. 1992/1338)
 Motor Vehicles (Type Approval) (Great Britain) (Amendment) Regulations 1992 (S.I. 1992/1341)
 Motor Vehicles (Type Approval for Goods Vehicles) (Great Britain) (Amendment) (No. 2) Regulations 1992 (S.I. 1992/1342)
 Police Pensions (Amendment) Regulations 1992 (S.I. 1992/1343)
 Sea Fish (Specified Sea Areas) (Regulation of Nets and Other Fishing Gear) (Variation) Order 1992 (S.I. 1992/1344)
 Civil Courts (Amendment No. 2) Order 1992 (S.I. 1992/1345)
 Finance Act 1991, section 58, (Commencement No. 2) Regulations 1992 (S.I. 1992/1346)
 Transport and Works Act 1992 (Commencement No. 1) Order 1992 (S.I. 1992/1347)
 Education Assets Board (Transfers under the Education Reform Act 1988) Regulations 1992 (S.I. 1992/1348)
 Neath Canal (Cnel Bach) (Repeal of Local Enactments) Order 1992 (S.I. 1992/1349)
 Local Authorities (Capital Finance) (Approved Investments) (Amendment) Regulations 1992 (S.I. 1992/1353)
 Motor Vehicles (Driving Licences) (Large Goods and Passenger-Carrying Vehicles) (Amendment) (No. 3) Regulations 1992 (S.I. 1992/1356)
 Food (Lot Marking) Regulations 1992 (S.I. 1992/1357)
 Environmentally Sensitive Areas (Cambrian Mountains) Designation (Amendment) Order 1992 (S.I. 1992/1359)
 Competition and Service (Utilities) Act 1992 Designation Order 1992 (S.I. 1992/1360)
 Sheep Scab (Revocation) Order 1992 (S.I. 1992/1361)
 Non-Domestic Rating Contributions (England) (Amendment) Regulations 1992 (S.I. 1992/1363)
 Motorways Traffic (England and Wales) (Amendment) Regulations 1992 (S.I. 1992/1364)
 Army Terms of Service Regulations 1992 (S.I. 1992/1365)
 Army Terms of Service (Part-time Service in Northern Ireland) Regulations 1992 (S.I. 1992/1366)
 Control of Pollution (Licensing of Waste Disposal) (Scotland) Amendment Regulations 1992 (S.I. 1992/1368)
 Blood Tests (Evidence of Paternity) (Amendment) Regulations 1992 (S.I. 1992/1369)
 Motor Vehicles (Off Road Events) Regulations 1992 (S.I. 1992/1370)
 Special Roads (Notice of Opening) Regulations 1992 (S.I. 1992/1371)
 London Priority Route Order 1992 (S.I. 1992/1372)
 A1 Trunk Road (Holloway Road, Islington) Experimental Traffic Order 1992 (S.I. 1992/1374)
 County Council of Norfolk (A1151 Wroxham/Hoveton Bypass, River Bure Bridge) Scheme 1988 Confirmation Instrument 1992 (S.I. 1992/1378)
 Sheriffs' Fees (Amendment) Order 1992 (S.I. 1992/1379)
 Portsmouth (Pilotage) Harbour Revision Order 1992 (S.I. 1992/1380)
 Control of Gold, Securities, Payments and Credits (Serbia and Montenegro) (Revocation) Directions 1992 (S.I. 1992/1381)
 Education (School Performance Information) (England) Regulations 1992 (S.I. 1992/1385)
 Sea Fish Industry Authority (Levy) (Amendment) Regulations 1992 Confirmatory Order 1992 (S.I. 1992/1386)
 Food Protection (Emergency Prohibitions) (Paralytic Shellfish Poisoning) Order 1992 (S.I. 1992/1387)
 Northern Ireland (Emergency Provisions) Act 1991 (Continuance) Order 1992 (S.I. 1992/1390)

1401-1500

 Council Tax (Discounts) (Scotland) Order 1992 (S.I. 1992/1408)
 Council Tax (Discounts) (Scotland) Regulations 1992 (S.I. 1992/1409)
 Road Traffic Act 1991 (Commencement No. 4 and Transitional Provisions) (Amendment) Order 1992 (S.I. 1992/1410)
 Northern Ireland (Emergency and Prevention of Terrorism Provisions) (Continuance) Order 1992 (S.I. 1992/1413)
 Export of Goods (Control) (Serbia and Montenegro Sanctions) (Revocation) Order 1992 (S.I. 1992/1419)
 Industrial Training Levy (Engineering Construction Board) Order 1992 (S.I. 1992/1420)
 Harbour Works (Assessment of Environmental Effects) Regulations 1992 (S.I. 1992/1421)
Act of Sederunt (Rules of the Court of Session Amendment No.4) (Solicitors, Notaries Public, Qualified Conveyancers and Executry Practitioners) 1992 (S.I. 1992/1422)
 Offshore Installations (Safety Zones) (No. 2) Order 1992 (S.I. 1992/1429)
 County Council of Norfolk (Reconstruction of Magdalen Bridge) Scheme 1991 Confirmation Instrument 1992 (S.I. 1992/1430)
 Child Support Act 1991 (Commencement No. 1) Order 1992 (S.I. 1992/1431)
 Police (Scotland) Amendment Regulations 1992 (S.I. 1992/1432)
 Act of Sederunt (Rules of the Court of Session Amendment No.3) (Taxation of Accounts) 1992 (S.I. 1992/1433)
 Act of Sederunt (Solicitor and Client Accounts in the Sheriff Court) 1992 (S.I. 1992/1434)
 Dundee Port Authority Harbour Revision Order 1992 (S.I. 1992/1435)
 Local Government Act 1988 (Defined Activities) (Exemption) (Erewash Borough Council) Order 1992 (S.I. 1992/1436)
 British Technology Group Act 1991 (Government Shareholding) Order 1992 (S.I. 1992/1437)
 Partnerships (Unrestricted Size) No. 4 (Amendment) Regulations 1992 (S.I. 1992/1438)
 Partnerships (Unrestricted Size) No. 10 Regulations 1992 (S.I. 1992/1439)
 Social Security (Contributions) Amendment (No. 6) Regulations 1992 (S.I. 1992/1440)
 Nursing Homes Registration (Scotland) Amendment Regulations 1992 (S.I. 1992/1443)
 Devon Ambulance Service National Health Service Trust (Transfer of Trust Property) Order 1992 (S.I. 1992/1444)
 Exeter and District Community Health Service National Health Service Trust (Transfer of Trust Property) Order 1992 (S.I. 1992/1445)
 Northern Devon Healthcare National Health Service Trust (Transfer of Trust Property) Order 1992 (S.I. 1992/1446)
 Scarborough and North East Yorkshire Health Care National Health Service Trust (Transfer of Trust Property) Order 1992 (S.I. 1992/1447)
 A13 Trunk Road (West of Heathway to Wennington Section, Trunk Road and Slip Roads) Order 1992 (S.I. 1992/1458)
 A13 Trunk Road (West of Heathway to Wennington Section, Detrunking) Order 1992 (S.I. 1992/1459)
 Local Government Finance Act 1992 (Commencement No. 3) Order 1992 (S.I. 1992/1460)
 City of Manchester (Bradford Mill Bridge) Scheme 1992 Confirmation Instrument 1992 (S.I. 1992/1463)
 Hovercraft (Fees) Regulations 1992 (S.I. 1992/1478)
 Sea Fishing (Enforcement of Community Conservation Measures) (Amendment) (No. 3) Order 1992 (S.I. 1992/1485)
 Non-Domestic Rating Act 1992 (Commencement No. 1) Order 1992 (S.I. 1992/1486)
 Act of Adjournal (Consolidation Amendment) (Criminal Justice International Co-operation Act 1990) 1992 (S.I. 1992/1489)
 Poultry Flocks, Hatcheries and Processed Animal Protein (Fees) Order 1992 (S.I. 1992/1490)
 Planning and Compensation Act 1991 (Commencement No. 10 and Transitional Provision) Order 1992 (S.I. 1992/1491)
 Town and Country Planning General Regulations 1992 (S.I. 1992/1492)
 Town and Country Planning General Development (Amendment) (No. 4) Order 1992 (S.I. 1992/1493)
 Town and Country Planning (Assessment of Environmental Effects) (Amendment) Regulations 1992 (S.I. 1992/1494)
 Local Government (Access to Information) (Variation) Order 1992 (S.I. 1992/1497)

1501-1600

 Immigration (Registration with Police) (Amendment) Regulations 1992 (S.I. 1992/1503)
 Registration of Births and Deaths (Welsh Language) (Amendment) Regulations 1992 (S.I. 1992/1504)
 A13 Trunk Road (Wennington to Dartford Tunnel Interchange Section, Detrunking) Order 1992 (S.I. 1992/1505)
 A13 Trunk Road (Wennington to Mar Dyke Section, Trunk Road and Slip Roads) Order 1992 (S.I. 1992/1506)
 Food Safety (Fisheries Products) (Derogations) Regulations 1992 (S.I. 1992/1507)
 Food Safety (Live Bivalve Molluscs) (Derogations) Regulations 1992 (S.I. 1992/1508)
 National Health Service (General Dental Services) Amendment Regulations 1992 (S.I. 1992/1509)
 Value Added Tax (Payments on Account) Order 1992 (S.I. 1992/1510)
 Non-Domestic Rating (Collection and Enforcement) (Local Lists) (Amendment) Regulations 1992 (S.I. 1992/1512)
 Non-Domestic Rating (Collection and Enforcement) (Central Lists) (Amendment) Regulations 1992 (S.I. 1992/1513)
 Non-Domestic Rating (Transitional Period) (Amendment) Regulations 1992 (S.I. 1992/1514)
 Non-Domestic Rating (Payment of Interest) (Amendment) Regulations 1992 (S.I. 1992/1515)
 Non-Domestic Rating Contributions (England) (Amendment) (No. 2) Regulations 1992 (S.I. 1992/1516)
 County Council of Norfolk (Reconstruction of Magdalen Bridge—Temporary Bridge) Scheme 1991 Confirmation Instrument 1992 (S.I. 1992/1517)
 Medicines (Medicated Animal Feeding Stuffs) (No. 2) Regulations 1992 (S.I. 1992/1520)
 Motor Vehicles (Off Road Events) (Amendment) Regulations 1992 (S.I. 1992/1523)
 Health and Safety (Leasing Arrangements) Regulations 1992 (S.I. 1992/1524)
 Cosmetic Products (Safety) (Amendment) Regulations 1992 (S.I. 1992/1525)
 Special Constables (Amendment) Regulations 1992 (S.I. 1992/1526)
 Reservoirs (Panels of Civil Engineers) (Application and Fees) Regulations 1992 (S.I. 1992/1527)
 National Health Service (General Dental Services) (Scotland) Amendment (No.2) Regulations 1992 (S.I. 1992/1528)
 Valuation and Community Charge Tribunals (Amendment) (Allowances) Regulations 1992 (S.I. 1992/1529)
 Community Charges and Non-Domestic Rating (Demand Notices) (Wales) (Amendment) (No. 3) Regulations 1992 (S.I. 1992/1530)
 Occupational and Personal Pension Schemes (Miscellaneous Amendments) Regulations 1992 (S.I. 1992/1531)
 Social Security Act 1990 (Commencement No. 5) Order 1992 (S.I. 1992/1532)
 Act of Sederunt (Rules of the Court of Session Amendment No.5) (Public Trusts) 1992 (S.I. 1992/1533)
 Medicines (Products Other Than Veterinary Drugs) (Prescription Only) Amendment Order 1992 (S.I. 1992/1534)
 Medicines (Products Other Than Veterinary Drugs) (General Sale List) Amendment Order 1992 (S.I. 1992/1535)
 Value Added Tax (Payments on Account) Regulations 1992 (S.I. 1992/1536)
 Building Societies (Member States) Order 1992 (S.I. 1992/1547)
 Education (National Curriculum) (Foundation Subjects at Key Stage 4) Order 1992 (S.I. 1992/1548)
 Coast Protection (Variation of Excluded Waters) (Chichester, Langstone and Portsmouth Harbours) Regulations 1992 (S.I. 1992/1549)
 Charge Limitation (England) (Maximum Amounts) Order 1992 (S.I. 1992/1550)
 Sports Grounds and Football (Amendment of Various Orders) Order 1992 (S.I. 1992/1554)
 Occupational Pension Schemes (Deficiency on Winding Up etc.) Regulations 1992 (S.I. 1992/1555)
 Public Order (Football Exclusion) (Amendment) Order 1992 (S.I. 1992/1556)
 Combined Probation Areas (Derbyshire) Order 1992 (S.I. 1992/1557)
 Beaumaris Port Health Authority (Revocation) Order 1992 (S.I. 1992/1558)
 Town and Country Planning (Special Enforcement Notices) Regulations 1992 (S.I. 1992/1562)
 Town and Country Planning General Development (Amendment) (No. 5) Order 1992 (S.I. 1992/1563)
 Merchant Shipping (Safe Manning Document) Regulations 1992 (S.I. 1992/1564)
 Local Loans (Procedure) (Amendment) Regulations 1992 (S.I. 1992/1565)
 Public Works Loans (Fees) (Amendment) Regulations 1992 (S.I. 1992/1566)
 Fatal Accidents and Sudden Deaths Inquiry Procedure (Scotland) Amendment Rules 1992 (S.I. 1992/1568)
 United Bristol Healthcare National Health Service Trust (Transfer of Trust Property) (No. 2) Order 1992 (S.I. 1992/1578)
 Non-automatic Weighing Instruments (EEC Requirements) Regulations 1993 S.I. 1992/1579)
 Weights and Measures (Packaged Goods) (Amendment) Regulations 1992 (S.I. 1992/1580)
 Merchant Shipping (Navigational Warnings) (Amendment) Regulations 1992 (S.I. 1992/1581)
 Merchant Shipping (Signals of Distress) Rules 1992 (S.I. 1992/1582)
 Environmental Protection (Controls on Injurious Substances) (No. 2) Regulations 1992 (S.I. 1992/1583)
 Non-Domestic Rating Contributions (Wales) (Amendment) Regulations 1992 (S.I. 1992/1584)
 Income-related Benefits Schemes (Miscellaneous Amendments) (No. 2) Regulations 1992 (S.I. 1992/1585)
 Civil Legal Aid (Financial Conditions) (Scotland) Regulations 1992 (S.I. 1992/1586)
 Advice and Assistance (Financial Conditions) (Scotland) Regulations 1992 (S.I. 1992/1587)
 Advice and Assistance (Assistance by Way of Representation) (Scotland) Amendment Regulations 1992 (S.I. 1992/1588)
 Education (Assisted Places) (Scotland) Amendment Regulations 1992 (S.I. 1992/1589)
 St Mary's Music School (Aided Places) Amendment Regulations 1992 (S.I. 1992/1590)
 Weights and Measures (Isle of Man) Order 1992 (S.I. 1992/1591)
 Weights and Measures (Jersey) Order 1992 (S.I. 1992/1592)
 Weights and Measures (Northern Ireland) Order 1992 (S.I. 1992/1593)
 Transfer of Colleges of Further Education (Scotland) Order 1992 (S.I. 1992/1597)
 Housing (Percentage of Approved Expense for Repairs Grants) (Lead Plumbing and Radon Gas Works) (Scotland) Order 1992 (S.I. 1992/1598)
 Law Reform (Miscellaneous Provisions) (Scotland) Act 1990 (Commencement No. 10) Order 1992 (S.I. 1992/1599)

1601-1700

 Imported Food (Bivalve Molluscs and Marine Gastropods from Japan) Regulations 1992 (S.I. 1992/1601)
 Motor Vehicles (Tests) (Amendment) (No. 2) Regulations 1992 (S.I. 1992/1609)
 Building Societies (Designated Capital Resources) Order 1992 (S.I. 1992/1611)
 Building Societies (Supplementary Capital) (Amendment) Order 1992 (S.I. 1992/1612)
 Oil and Fibre Plant Seeds (Amendment) Regulations 1992 (S.I. 1992/1613)
 Fodder Plant Seeds (Amendment) Regulations 1992 (S.I. 1992/1614)
 Seeds (National Lists of Varieties) (Amendment) Regulations 1992 (S.I. 1992/1615)
 Value Added Tax (General) (Amendment) (No.2) Regulations 1992 (S.I. 1992/1617)
 Local Authorities (Capital Finance) (Amendment) (No. 2) Regulations 1992 (S.I. 1992/1618)
 Private Medical Insurance (Disentitlement to Tax Relief and Approved Benefits) (Amendment) Regulations 1992 (S.I. 1992/1619)
 Town and Country Planning (Isles of Scilly) Order 1992 (S.I. 1992/1620)
 Motor Cars (Driving Instruction) (Amendment) Regulations 1992 (S.I. 1992/1621)
 Portsmouth Mile End (Albert Johnson Quay) Harbour Revision Order 1992 (S.I. 1992/1623)
 Local Government Act 1988 (Defined Activities) (Exemption) (Small Schools) Order 1992 (S.I. 1992/1626)
 Public Libraries (Inquiries Procedure) Rules 1992 (S.I. 1992/1627)
 Valuation Timetable (Scotland) Amendment Order 1992 (S.I. 1992/1628)
 Revenue Support Grant (Scotland) (No. 2) Order 1992 (S.I. 1992/1629)
 Planning and Compensation Act 1991 (Commencement No. 11 and Transitional Provisions) Order 1992 (S.I. 1992/1630)
 Special Constables (Amendment) (No. 2) Regulations 1992 (S.I. 1992/1641)
 Non-Domestic Rating Act 1992 (Commencement No. 2) Order 1992 (S.I. 1992/1642)
 Rating Lists (Valuation Date) Order 1992 (S.I. 1992/1643)
 Housing (Relevant Works) (Scotland) Regulations 1992 (S.I. 1992/1653)
 Value Added Tax (Cars) (Amendment) (No. 2) Order 1992 (S.I. 1992/1654)
 Friendly Societies (Modification of the Corporation Tax Acts) Regulations 1992 (S.I. 1992/1655)
 Criminal Justice Act 1991 (Contracted Out Prisons) Order 1992 (S.I. 1992/1656)
 Education (Assisted Places) (Incidental Expenses) (Amendment) Regulations 1992 (S.I. 1992/1661)
 Education (Grants) (Music and Ballet Schools) (Amendment) Regulations 1992 (S.I. 1992/1662)
 Chester-Bangor Trunk Road (A55) (St Asaph Business Park Slip Roads) Order 1992 (S.I. 1992/1664)
 Value Added Tax (Payments on Account) (No.2) Order 1992 (S.I. 1992/1668)
 Criminal Justice Act 1991 (Notice of Transfer) Regulations 1992 (S.I. 1992/1670)
 New Roads and Street Works Act 1991 (Commencement No. 4) (Scotland) Order 1992 (S.I. 1992/1671)
 Road Works (Sharing of Costs of Works) (Scotland) Regulations 1992 (S.I. 1992/1672)
 Road Works (Maintenance) (Scotland) Regulations 1992 (S.I. 1992/1673)
 Road Works (Reinstatement) (Scotland) Regulations 1992 (S.I. 1992/1674)
 Road Works (Qualifications of Supervisors and Operatives) (Scotland) Regulations 1992 (S.I. 1992/1675)
 Road Works (Inspection Fees) (Scotland) Regulations 1992 (S.I. 1992/1676)
 Sheriff (Removal from Office) Order 1992 (S.I. 1992/1677)
 PARLIAMENT S.I. 1992/1683)
 Telecommunications Act 1984 (Extension of Relevant Period) (No. 3) Order 1992 (S.I. 1992/1684)
 Radioactive Substances (Records of Convictions) Regulations 1992 (S.I. 1992/1685)
 New Roads and Street Works Act 1991 (Commencement No. 3) Order 1992 (S.I. 1992/1686)
 Street Works (Qualifications of Supervisors and Operatives) Regulations 1992 (S.I. 1992/1687)
 Street Works (Inspection Fees) Regulations 1992 (S.I. 1992/1688)
 Street Works (Reinstatement) Regulations 1992 (S.I. 1992/1689)
 Street Works (Sharing of Costs of Works) Regulations 1992 (S.I. 1992/1690)
 Street Works (Maintenance) Regulations 1992 (S.I. 1992/1691)
 Social Security (Widow's Benefit and Retirement Pensions) (Amendment) Regulations 1992 (S.I. 1992/1695)
 Greater London and Hertfordshire (County Boundaries) Order 1992 (S.I. 1992/1696)
 Education (National Curriculum) (Attainment Targets and Programmes of Study in Welsh) (Amendment) Order 1992 (S.I. 1992/1698)
 Companies (Single Member Private Limited Companies) Regulations 1992 (S.I. 1992/1699)
 Social Security Benefit (Persons Abroad) Amendment Regulations 1992 (S.I. 1992/1700)

1701-1800

 Pensions for Dependants of the Prime Minister or Speaker (Designated Provisions) Regulations 1992 (S.I. 1992/1701)
 Northern Ireland Act 1974 (Interim Period Extension) Order 1992 (S.I. 1992/1702)
 Housing (Right to Buy) (Prescribed Persons) Order 1992 (S.I. 1992/1703)
 Housing (Right to Buy) (Mortgage Limit) Regulations 1992 (S.I. 1992/1704)
 Housing (Right to Buy) (Mortgage Costs) Order 1992 (S.I. 1992/1706)
 Housing (Right to Buy) (Prescribed Forms) (Amendment) Regulations 1992 (S.I. 1992/1707)
 Housing (Service Charge Loans) Regulations 1992 (S.I. 1992/1708)
 Housing (Preservation of Right to Buy) (Amendment) Regulations 1992 (S.I. 1992/1709)
 Housing (Right to Buy) (Prescribed Form: Right to a Mortgage) Regulations 1992 (S.I. 1992/1710)
 European Communities (Designation) (No. 2) Order 1992 (S.I. 1992/1711)
 Army, Air Force and Naval Discipline Acts (Continuation) Order 1992 (S.I. 1992/1712)
 Education (Inspectors of Schools in England) Order 1992 (S.I. 1992/1713)
 Child Abduction and Custody (Parties to Conventions) (Amendment) (No. 3) Order 1992 (S.I. 1992/1714)
 Criminal Justice Act 1988 (Torture) (Overseas Territories) (Amendment) Order 1992 (S.I. 1992/1715)
 Mauritius Appeals to Judicial Committee Order 1992 (S.I. 1992/1716)
 Merchant Shipping (Confirmation of Legislation) (Falkland Islands) Order 1992 (S.I. 1992/1717)
 Anatomy (Northern Ireland) Order 1992 (S.I. 1992/1718)
 Appropriation (No. 2) (Northern Ireland) Order 1992 (S.I. 1992/1719)
 Competition and Service (Electricity) (Northern Ireland) Order 1992 (S.I. 1992/1720)
 Criminal Justice (International Co-operation) Act 1990 (Enforcement of Overseas Forfeiture Orders) (Amendment) Order 1992 (S.I. 1992/1721)
 Drug Trafficking Offences Act 1986 (Designated Countries and Territories) (Amendment) Order 1992 (S.I. 1992/1722)
 Firearms (Amendment) (Northern Ireland) Order 1992 (S.I. 1992/1723)
 Football Spectators (Corresponding Offences in Italy, Scotland and Sweden) (Amendment) Order 1992 (S.I. 1992/1724)
 Housing (Northern Ireland) Order 1992 (S.I. 1992/1725)
 Licensing (Validation) (Northern Ireland) Order 1992 (S.I. 1992/1726)
 Vienna Document 1992 (Privileges and Immunities) Order 1992 (S.I. 1992/1727)
 Offshore, and Pipelines, Safety (Northern Ireland) Order 1992 (S.I. 1992/1728)
 Summer Time Order 1992 (S.I. 1992/1729)
 Crown Office (Forms and Proclamations Rules) Order 1992 (S.I. 1992/1730)
 Reciprocal Enforement of Foreign Judgments (Canada) (Amendment) Order 1992 (S.I. 1992/1731)
 Parliamentary Corporate Bodies (Crown Immunities etc.) Order 1992 (S.I. 1992/1732)
 Confiscation of the Proceeds of Drug Trafficking (Designated Countries and Territories) (Scotland) Amendment Order 1992 (S.I. 1992/1733)
 Criminal Justice (International Co-operation) Act 1990 (Enforcement of Overseas Forfeiture Orders) (Scotland) Amendment Order 1992 (S.I. 1992/1734)
 Social Security (Jersey and Guernsey) Order 1992 (S.I. 1992/1735)
 Merchant Shipping (Categorisation of Registries of Overseas Territories) Order 1992 (S.I. 1992/1736)
 Transfer of Functions (Treasury and Minister for the Civil Service) Order 1992 (S.I. 1992/1737)
 Trustee Investments (Additional Powers) Order 1992 (S.I. 1992/1738)
 Education (Chief Inspector of Schools in Wales) Order 1992 (S.I. 1992/1739)
 Education (Inspectors of Schools in Wales) Order 1992 (S.I. 1992/1740)
 Council Tax (Administration and Enforcement) (Attachment of Earnings Order) (Wales) Regulations 1992 (S.I. 1992/1741)
 Local Authorities (Calculation of Council Tax Base) (Amendment) Regulations 1992 (S.I. 1992/1742)
 Income Tax (Interest Relief) (Qualifying Lenders) Order 1992 (S.I. 1992/1745)
 Finance Act 1991, section 49, (Appointed Day) Order 1992 (S.I. 1992/1746)
 Parochial Fees Order 1992 (S.I. 1992/1747)
 Church of England Pensions (Amendment) Regulations 1992 (S.I. 1992/1748)
 Legal Officers (Annual Fees) Order 1992 (S.I. 1992/1749)
 Arms Control and Disarmament (Inspections) Act 1991 (Commencement) Order 1992 (S.I. 1992/1750)
 Gas (Modification of Therm Limits) Order 1992 (S.I. 1992/1751)
 Health and Safety (Fees) Regulations 1992 (S.I. 1992/1752)
 Housing and Planning Act 1986 (Commencement No. 17 and Transitional Provisions) Order 1992 (S.I. 1992/1753)
 North Hull Housing Action Trust (Transfer of Property) (No. 2) Order 1992 (S.I. 1992/1754)
 Local Government Finance Act 1992 (Commencement No. 4) Order 1992 (S.I. 1992/1755)
 Sole (Eastern English Channel) (Prohibition of Fishing) Order 1992 (S.I. 1992/1756)
 Motor Vehicles (Driving Licences) (Amendment) (No. 3) Regulations 1992 (S.I. 1992/1757)
 Motor Vehicles (Driving Licences) (Large Goods and Passenger-Carrying Vehicles) (Amendment) (No. 4) Regulations 1992 (S.I. 1992/1761)
 Stepps Bypass (M80) and Connecting Roads and the Glasgow Monklands Motorway (Stage I) (Speed Limit) Amendment Regulations 1992 (S.I. 1992/1762)
 Town and Country Planning (Control of Advertisements) (Scotland) Amendment Regulations 1992 (S.I. 1992/1763)
 Highlands and Islands Development Board Dissolution Order 1992 (S.I. 1992/1764)
 Coal Industry (Restructuring Grants) Order 1992 (S.I. 1992/1766)
 Caledonian MacBrayne Limited (Rateable Values) (Scotland) Order 1992 (S.I. 1992/1782)
 Glasgow Underground (Rateable Values) (Scotland) Order 1992 (S.I. 1992/1783)
 Lochaber Power Company (Rateable Values) (Scotland) Order 1992 (S.I. 1992/1784)
 Scottish Nuclear Limited (Rateable Values) (Scotland) Order 1992 (S.I. 1992/1785)
 Forth Ports plc (Rateable Values) (Scotland) Order 1992 (S.I. 1992/1786)
 Water Undertakings (Rateable Values) (Scotland) Order 1992 (S.I. 1992/1787)
 Scottish Power plc. (Rateable Values) (Scotland) Order 1992 (S.I. 1992/1788)
 British Alcan Primary and Recycling Ltd. (Rateable Values) (Scotland) Order 1992 (S.I. 1992/1789)
 Electricity Generators (Rateable Values) (Scotland) Order 1992 (S.I. 1992/1790)
 Mercury Communications Ltd. (Rateable Values) (Scotland) Order 1992 (S.I. 1992/1791)
 British Gas plc. (Rateable Values) (Scotland) Order 1992 (S.I. 1992/1792)
 Scottish Hydro-Electric plc. (Rateable Values) (Scotland) Order 1992 (S.I. 1992/1793)
 British Telecommunications plc. (Rateable Values) (Scotland) Order 1992 (S.I. 1992/1794)
 British Railways Board (Rateable Values) (Scotland) Order 1992 (S.I. 1992/1795)
 Oil Related and Petrochemical Plants (Rateable Values) (Scotland) Order 1992 (S.I. 1992/1796)
 Education (Assisted Places) (Amendment) Regulations 1992 (S.I. 1992/1798)

1801-1900

 Education (Teachers) (Amendment) Regulations 1992 (S.I. 1992/1809)
 Civil Courts (Amendment No. 3) Order 1992 (S.I. 1992/1810)
 Health and Safety (Miscellaneous Provisions) (Metrication etc.) Regulations 1992 (S.I. 1992/1811)
 Child Support (Information, Evidence and Disclosure) Regulations 1992 (S.I. 1992/1812)
 Child Support (Maintenance Assessment Procedure) Regulations 1992 (S.I. 1992/1813)
 Council Tax Benefit (General) Regulations 1992 (S.I. 1992/1814)
 Child Support (Maintenance Assessments and Special Cases) Regulations 1992 (S.I. 1992/1815)
 Child Support (Arrears, Interest and Adjustment of Maintenance Assessments) Regulations 1992 (S.I. 1992/1816)
 Town and Country Planning (Fees for Applications and Deemed Applications) (Amendment) Regulations 1992 (S.I. 1992/1817)
 Sandwell Borough Council (Churchbridge Canal Bridges) Scheme 1991 Confirmation Instrument 1992 (S.I. 1992/1818)
 A1 Motorway (Walshford to Dishforth Section and Connecting Roads) Scheme 1992 (S.I. 1992/1819)
 Northern Ireland (Prescribed Area) (Amendment) Regulations 1992 (S.I. 1992/1820)
 Excise Duties (Small Non-Commercial Consignments) Relief (Amendment) Regulations 1992 (S.I. 1992/1821)
 Aylesbury Vale Community Healthcare National Health Service Trust (Establishment) Amendment Order 1992 (S.I. 1992/1822)
 A1 Trunk Road (Walshford to Dishforth Interchange Detrunking) Order 1992 (S.I. 1992/1823)
 A1 Motorway (Walshford to Dishforth Section: Parts of A1 Northbound Carriageway) Scheme 1992 (S.I. 1992/1824)
 A168 Trunk Road (Dishforth Interchange) Scheme 1992 (S.I. 1992/1825)
 A168 Trunk Road (Dishforth Interchange Slip Roads) Order 1992 (S.I. 1992/1826)
 A168 Trunk Road (Dishforth Interchange Link Road Detrunking) Order 1992 (S.I. 1992/1827)
 Parole Board (Transfer of Functions) Order 1992 (S.I. 1992/1829)
 North Yorkshire and West Yorkshire (County Boundaries) Order 1992 (S.I. 1992/1830)
 Local Government Finance (Consequential Amendment) (Coventry City Council) Order 1992 (S.I. 1992/1831)
 Gipsy Encampments (District of Daventry) Order 1992 (S.I. 1992/1832)
 Housing (Right to a Shared Ownership Lease) (Further Advances Limit) (No. 2) Regulations 1992 (S.I. 1992/1833)
 Justices' Clerks (Qualifications of Assistants) (Amendment) Rules 1992 (S.I. 1992/1834)
 Horticultural Development Council (Amendment) Order 1992 (S.I. 1992/1836)
 Assistance for Minor Works to Dwellings (Lead Pipes) Order 1992 (S.I. 1992/1837)
 Value Added Tax (Payments on Account) (No. 2) Regulations 1992 (S.I. 1992/1844)
 Assistance for Minor Works to Dwellings (Amendment) Regulations 1992 (S.I. 1992/1845)
 Crown Court (Amendment) Rules 1992 (S.I. 1992/1847)
 Criminal Justice Act 1991 (Dismissal of Transferred Charges) Rules 1992 (S.I. 1992/1848)
 Education (Charlotte Mason College of Education Higher Education Corporation) (Dissolution) Order 1992 (S.I. 1992/1849)
 Stafford and Staffordshire Moorlands (District Boundaries) Order 1992 (S.I. 1992/1850)
 Access to Personal Files (Housing) (Scotland) Regulations 1992 (S.I. 1992/1852)
 Data Protection (Regulation of Financial Services etc.) (Subject Access Exemption) (Amendment) Order 1992 (S.I. 1992/1855)
 Magistrates' Courts (Unit Fines) Rules 1992 (S.I. 1992/1856)
 Education (National Curriculum) (Assessment Arrangements for English, Mathematics, Science, Technology, History and Geography) (Key Stage 1) Order 1992 (S.I. 1992/1857)
 Education (National Curriculum) (Assessment Arrangements for English, Mathematics, Science and Technology) (Key Stage 3) Order 1992 (S.I. 1992/1858)
 City of Coventry (North-South Road Phase 1) (Coventry Canal Bridges) Scheme 1990 Confirmation Instrument 1992 (S.I. 1992/1859)
 Finance (No. 2) Act 1992 (Commencement) Order 1992 (S.I. 1992/1867)
 Museums and Galleries Act 1992 (Commencement) Order 1992 (S.I. 1992/1874)
 Telecommunication Apparatus (Approval Fees) (British Approvals Board for Telecommunications) Order 1992 (S.I. 1992/1875)
 Act of Sederunt (Fees of Witnesses and Shorthand Writers in the Sheriff Court) 1992 (S.I. 1992/1878)
 Act of Sederunt (Fees of Solicitors in Speculative Actions) 1992 (S.I. 1992/1879)
 Personal Community Charge (Nursing Students) (Scotland) Regulations 1992 (S.I. 1992/1880)
 Haddock (Specified Sea Areas) (Prohibition of Fishing) Order 1992 (S.I. 1992/1881)
 Industrial Training (Road Transport Board) (Revocation) Order 1992 (S.I. 1992/1895)
 Milk (Special Designations) (Scotland) Amendment Order 1992 (S.I. 1992/1896)
 Act of Sederunt (Fees of Advocates in Speculative Actions) 1992 (S.I. 1992/1897)
 Act of Sederunt (Rules of the Court of Session Amendment No.8) (Fees of Solicitors in Speculative Actions) 1992 (S.I. 1992/1898)
 Court of Protection (Amendment) Rules 1992 (S.I. 1992/1899)
 Charities Act 1992 (Commencement No. 1 and Transitional Provisions) Order 1992 (S.I. 1992/1900)

1901-2000

 Charities (Misleading Names) Regulations 1992 (S.I. 1992/1901)
 Civil Aviation (Route Charges for Navigation Services) (Fourth Amendment) Regulations 1992 (S.I. 1992/1902)
 Town and Country Planning (Enforcement) (Inquiries Procedure) Rules 1992 (S.I. 1992/1903)
 Town and Country Planning (Enforcement Notices and Appeals) (Amendment) Regulations 1992 (S.I. 1992/1904)
 Act of Sederunt (Rules of the Court of Session Amendment No.6) (Shorthand Writers' Fees) 1992 (S.I. 1992/1905)
 Act of Sederunt (Rules of the Court of Session Amendment No.7) (Witnesses' Fees) 1992 (S.I. 1992/1906)
 Rules of the Supreme Court (Amendment No. 2) 1992 (S.I. 1992/1907)
 Council Tax Benefit (Transitional) Order 1992 (S.I. 1992/1909)
 Building (Self-Certification of Structural Design) (Scotland) Regulations 1992 (S.I. 1992/1911)
 Alcoholic Liquor (Amendment of Units of Measurement) Order 1992 (S.I. 1992/1917)
 Shipbuilders' Relief (Specified Structures) (Amendment) Order 1992 (S.I. 1992/1918)
 Environmentally Sensitive Areas (Loch Lomond) Designation Order 1992 (S.I. 1992/1919)
 Environmentally Sensitive Areas (Breadalbane) Designation Order 1992 (S.I. 1992/1920)
 Dartford-Thurrock Crossing Tolls Order 1992 (S.I. 1992/1933)
 Dartford-Thurrock Crossing (Amendment) Regulations 1992 (S.I. 1992/1934)
 Planning and Compensation Act 1991 (Commencement No. 12 and Transitional Provisions) (Scotland) Order 1992 (S.I. 1992/1937)
 Child Support Act 1991 (Commencement No. 2) Order 1992 (S.I. 1992/1938)
 Plant Breeders' Rights (Amendment) Regulations 1992 (S.I. 1992/1939)
 Plant Breeders' Rights (Miscellaneous Ornamental Plants) (Variation) Scheme 1992 (S.I. 1992/1940)
 Timeshare Act 1992 (Commencement) Order 1992 (S.I. 1992/1941)
 Timeshare (Cancellation Notices) Order 1992 (S.I. 1992/1942)
 Timeshare (Repayment of Credit on Cancellation) Order 1992 (S.I. 1992/1943)
 Town and Country Planning (Fees for Applications and Deemed Applications) (Scotland) Amendment Regulations 1992 (S.I. 1992/1951)
 Education (Government of Further Education Corporations) (Former Sixth Form Colleges) Regulations 1992 (S.I. 1992/1957)
 Northern Ireland (Emergency Provisions) Act 1991 (Amendment) Order 1992 (S.I. 1992/1958)
 A20 London–Folkestone–Dover Trunk Road (Sidcup Bypass Improvement Detrunking) Order 1992 (S.I. 1992/1961)
 Academic Awards and Distinctions (Queen Margaret College) (Scotland) Order of Council 1992 (S.I. 1992/1962)
 Education (Government of Further Education Corporations) (Former Further Education Colleges) Regulations 1992 (S.I. 1992/1963)
 Hastings and Rother National Health Service Trust (Transfer of Trust Property) Order 1992 (S.I. 1992/1964)
 County Court (Amendment No. 2) Rules 1992 (S.I. 1992/1965)
 Lay Representatives (Rights of Audience) Order 1992 (S.I. 1992/1966)
 Flavourings in Food Regulations 1992 (S.I. 1992/1971)
 Agricultural Holdings (Units of Production) Order 1992 (S.I. 1992/1972)
 Salmon Act 1986 (Commencement and Transitional Provisions) Order 1992 (S.I. 1992/1973)
 Salmon (Definition of Methods of Net Fishing and Construction of Nets) (Scotland) Regulations 1992 (S.I. 1992/1974)
 Western Isles Islands Council (Ardveenish) Harbour Revision Order 1992 (S.I. 1992/1975)
 Western Isles Islands Council (Breasclete) Harbour Revision Order 1992 (S.I. 1992/1976)
 Shetland Islands Council (North Haven, Fair Isle) Harbour Revision Order 1992 (S.I. 1992/1977)
 Food Additives Labelling Regulations 1992 (S.I. 1992/1978)
 Town and Country Planning General (Amendment) Regulations 1992 (S.I. 1992/1982)
 Education (National Curriculum) (Assessment Arrangements for English, Welsh, Mathematics, Science, Technology, Welsh Second Language, History and Geography) (Key Stage 1) (Wales) Order 1992 (S.I. 1992/1983)
 Bournemouth and District Water Company (Constitution and Regulation) Order 1992 (S.I. 1992/1988)
 Child Support (Collection and Enforcement) Regulations 1992 (S.I. 1992/1989)
 Local Government Superannuation (National Rivers Authority) Regulations 1992 (S.I. 1992/1991)
 Cheshire and Merseyside (County Boundaries) Order 1992 (S.I. 1992/1992)
 West Hampshire Water Company (Constitution and Regulation) Order 1992 (S.I. 1992/1993)

2001-2100

 Child Resistant Packaging and Tactile Danger Warnings (Safety) Regulations 1992 (S.I. 1992/2006)
 Residential Care Homes (Amendment) Regulations 1992 (S.I. 1992/2007)
 Wireless Telegraphy (Cordless Telephone Apparatus) (Exemption) Regulations 1992 (S.I. 1992/2008)
 Wireless Telegraphy (Cordless Telephone Apparatus) (Restriction and Marking) Order 1992 (S.I. 1992/2009)
 Road Traffic Act 1991 (Commencement No. 5 and Transitional Provisions) Order 1992 (S.I. 1992/2010)
 Housing (Change of Landlord) (Payment of Disposal Cost by Instalments) (Amendment) (No. 2) Regulations 1992 (S.I. 1992/2011)
 East Hertfordshire Health National Health Service Trust (Changeof Name) Order 1992 (S.I. 1992/2014)
 Clatterbridge Centre for Oncology National Health Service Trust (Transfer of Trust Property) Order 1992 (S.I. 1992/2015)
 Road Vehicles (Construction and Use) (Amendment) (No. 4) Regulations 1992 (S.I. 1992/2016)
 Sea Fishing (Enforcement of Community Conservation Measures) (Amendment) (No. 4) Order 1992 (S.I. 1992/2017)
 A52 Trunk Road (Ashbourne Relief Road) Order 1992 (S.I. 1992/2018)
 Professions Supplementary to Medicine (Registration Rules) (Amendment) Order of Council 1992 (S.I. 1992/2021)
 Food Protection (Emergency Prohibitions) (Paralytic Shellfish Poisoning) (Revocation) Order 1992 (S.I. 1992/2024)
 Education (Registered Inspectors) (Fees) Regulations 1992 (S.I. 1992/2025)
 Cheshire and Greater Manchester (County and District Boundaries) Order 1992 (S.I. 1992/2026)
 Export of Goods (Control) (Amendment No. 3) Order 1992 (S.I. 1992/2035)
 Poultry Meat (Hygiene) (Amendment) Regulations 1992 (S.I. 1992/2036)
 Fresh Meat (Hygiene and Inspection) Regulations 1992 (S.I. 1992/2037)
 Town and Country Planning (Inquiries Procedure) Rules 1992 (S.I. 1992/2038)
 Town and Country Planning Appeals (Determination by Inspectors) (Inquiries Procedure) Rules 1992 (S.I. 1992/2039)
 County Court (Forms) (Amendment No. 2) Rules 1992 (S.I. 1992/2040)
 Further and Higher Education Act 1992 (Commencement No. 1 and Transitional Provisions) (Amendment) Order 1992 (S.I. 1992/2041)
 Education (National Curriculum) (Assessment Arrangements for English, Welsh, Mathematics, Science, Welsh Second Language and Technology) (Key Stage 3) (Wales) Order 1992 (S.I. 1992/2042)
 Transport and Works Act 1992 (Commencement No. 2) Order 1992 (S.I. 1992/2043)
 Transport (Guided Systems) Order 1992 (S.I. 1992/2044)
 Registration of Births, Still-births, Deaths and Marriages (Prescription of Forms) (Scotland) Amendment Regulations 1992 (S.I. 1992/2045)
 Magistrates' Courts Committees (Constitution) (Amendment) Regulations 1992 (S.I. 1992/2047)
 Management of Health and Safety at Work Regulations 1992 (S.I. 1992/2051)
 Land Registration (Scotland) Act 1979 (Commencement No.6) Order 1992 (S.I. 1992/2060)
 Poultry Meat (Hygiene) (Scotland) Amendment Regulations 1992 (S.I. 1992/2061)
 Environmentally Sensitive Areas (Loch Lomond) Designation Amendment Order 1992 (S.I. 1992/2062)
 Environmentally Sensitive Areas (Breadalbane) Designation Amendment Order 1992 (S.I. 1992/2063)
 Family Proceedings (Amendment No. 2) Rules 1992 (S.I. 1992/2067)
 Family Proceedings Courts (Miscellaneous Amendments) Rules 1992 (S.I. 1992/2068)
 Magistrates' Courts (Attendance Centre) Rules 1992 (S.I. 1992/2069)
 Magistrates' Courts (Notice of Transfer) (Children's Evidence) Rules 1992 (S.I. 1992/2070)
 Magistrates' Courts (Children and Young Persons) Rules 1992 (S.I. 1992/2071)
 Magistrates' Courts (Criminal Justice Act 1991) (Miscellaneous Amendments) Rules 1992 (S.I. 1992/2072)
 Finance Act 1989, section 178(1), (Appointed Day) Order 1992 (S.I. 1992/2073)
 Income Tax (Manufactured Interest) Regulations 1992 (S.I. 1992/2074)
 Taxes (Interest Rate) (Amendment No. 3) Regulations 1992 (S.I. 1992/2075)
 Community Service and Combination Orders Rules 1992 (S.I. 1992/2076)
 Probation (Amendment) (No. 2) Rules 1992 (S.I. 1992/2077)
 Building (Amendment of Prescribed Fees) Regulations 1992 (S.I. 1992/2079)
 Prison (Amendment) (No. 2) Rules 1992 (S.I. 1992/2080)
 Young Offender Institution (Amendment) (No. 2) Rules 1992 (S.I. 1992/2081)
 Charities (Scheme for the Transfer of Assets) (Scotland) Regulations 1992 (S.I. 1992/2082)
 Town and Country Planning (General Development Procedure) (Scotland) Amendment Order 1992 (S.I. 1992/2083)
 Town and Country Planning (General Permitted Development) (Scotland) Amendment (No.2) Order 1992 (S.I. 1992/2084)
 Town and Country Planning (Enforcement of Control) (No. 2) (Scotland) Regulations 1992 (S.I. 1992/2086)
 Wireless Telegraphy Apparatus Approval and Test Fees Order 1992 (S.I. 1992/2087)
 Greater London and Hertfordshire (County and District Boundaries) Order 1992 (S.I. 1992/2088)
 Land Registration Fees Order 1992 (S.I. 1992/2089)
 Greater London and Kent (County Boundaries) Order 1992 (S.I. 1992/2090)
 Cheshire and Greater Manchester (County and District Boundaries) (No. 2) Order 1992 (S.I. 1992/2091)
 Derbyshire and Nottinghamshire (County Boundaries) Order 1992 (S.I. 1992/2092)
 Surrey and West Sussex (County Boundaries) Order 1992 (S.I. 1992/2093)
 East Sussex, West Sussex and Kent (County Boundaries) Order 1992 (S.I. 1992/2096)
 Education (Further Education Corporations) Order 1992 (S.I. 1992/2097)
 Tower Hamlets (Prescribed Routes) Traffic Order 1968 (Variation) Order 1992 (S.I. 1992/2099)

2101-2200

 Organic Products Regulations 1992 (S.I. 1992/2111)
 Children (Secure Accommodation) Amendment Regulations 1992 (S.I. 1992/2117)
 Criminal Justice Act 1991 (Commencement No. 3 (Amendment) and Transitional Provisions and Savings) (Scotland) Order 1992 (S.I. 1992/2118)
 Essex and Hertfordshire (County Boundaries) Order 1992 (S.I. 1992/2119)
 Greater Manchester and West Yorkshire (County and District Boundaries) Order 1992 (S.I. 1992/2120)
 Combined Probation Areas Order 1992 (S.I. 1992/2121)
 North, South and West Yorkshire (County and District Boundaries) Order 1992 (S.I. 1992/2122)
 Road Vehicles (Construction and Use) (Amendment) (No. 5) Regulations 1992 (S.I. 1992/2137)
 Housing Benefit and Community Charge Benefits (Miscellaneous Amendments) (No.2) Regulations 1992 (S.I. 1992/2148)
 Social Fund Maternity and Funeral Expenses (General) Amendment Regulations 1992 (S.I. 1992/2149)
 Education (Crewe and Alsager College of Higher Education Higher Education Corporation) (Dissolution) Order 1992 (S.I. 1992/2151)
 Education (Higher Education Corporations) (No. 8) Order 1992 (S.I. 1992/2152)
 Motor Vehicles (Type Approval) (Amendment) Regulations 1992 (S.I. 1992/2154)
 Income-related Benefits Schemes (Miscellaneous Amendments) (No. 3) Regulations 1992 (S.I. 1992/2155)
 United Kingdom Central Council for Nursing, Midwifery and Health Visiting (Electoral Scheme) Order 1992 (S.I. 1992/2159)
 United Kingdom Central Council for Nursing, Midwifery and Health Visiting (Membership Proposal) Approval Order 1992 (S.I. 1992/2160)
 Motor Vehicles (Type Approval) (Great Britain) (Amendment) (No. 2) Regulations 1992 (S.I. 1992/2161)
 Local Government Act 1988 (Defined Activities) (Exemption) (Tamworth Borough Council) Order 1992 (S.I. 1992/2162)
 National Health Service (Determination of Districts) (No. 3) Order 1992 (S.I. 1992/2163)
 National Health Service (District Health Authorities) (No. 3) Order 1992 (S.I. 1992/2164)
 Charities Accounts (Scotland) Regulations 1992 (S.I. 1992/2165)
 Red Bank Instrument of Management (Variation) Order 1992 (S.I. 1992/2170)
 Tribunals and Inquiries (Discretionary Inquiries) (Amendment) Order 1992 (S.I. 1992/2171)
 Education (Grants) (Voluntary Aided Sixth Form Colleges) Regulations 1992 (S.I. 1992/2181)
 Fines (Deductions from Income Support) Regulations 1992 (S.I. 1992/2182)
 Local Government Finance Act 1992 (Commencement No. 5 and Transitional Provisions) Order 1992 (S.I. 1992/2183)
 Non-Domestic Rating (Payment of Interest) (Scotland) Regulations 1992 (S.I. 1992/2184)
 Registration of Births, Deaths and Marriages (Miscellaneous Provisions) (Scotland) Amendment Regulations 1992 (S.I. 1992/2185)
 Registration of Births, Still-births, Deaths and Marriages (Prescription of Forms) (Scotland) Amendment (No. 2) Regulations 1992 (S.I. 1992/2186)
 Education (Higher Education Corporations) (Wales) (No. 2) Order 1992 (S.I. 1992/2190)
 Indictments (Procedure) (Amendment) Rules 1992 (S.I. 1992/2197)

2201-2300

 Notification of Cooling Towers and Evaporative Condensers Regulations 1992 (S.I. 1992/2225)
 St Gabriel's, Knolle Park, Woolton, Liverpool Instrument of Management (Variation) Order 1992 (S.I. 1992/2226)
 Inshore Fishing (Prohibition of Fishing for Cockles) (Scotland) Order 1992 (S.I. 1992/2230)
 Gipsy Encampments (District of Vale of White Horse) Order 1992 (S.I. 1992/2238)
 Registered Homes (Amendment) Act 1991 (Commencement) Order 1992 (S.I. 1992/2240)
 Residential Care Homes (Amendment) (No. 2) Regulations 1992 (S.I. 1992/2241)
 Local Government (Promotion of Economic Development) (Amendment) Regulations 1992 (S.I. 1992/2242)
 Closure of Prisons (H.M. Prison Northeye) Order 1992 (S.I. 1992/2250)
 Education (London Residuary Body) (Transfer of Functions and Property) (No. 2) Order 1992 (S.I. 1992/2257)
 St Helens and Knowsley Hospital Services National Health Service Trust (Transfer of Trust Property) Order 1992 (S.I. 1992/2263)
 Education (School Performance Information) (Wales) Regulations 1992 (S.I. 1992/2274)
 National Rivers Authority (Anglian Region) (Reconstitution of the Welland and Deepings Internal Drainage Board) Order 1992 (S.I. 1992/2287)
 Education Assets Board (Transfers under the Further and Higher Education Act 1992) Regulations 1992 (S.I. 1992/2288)
 Act of Sederunt (Rules of the Court of Session Amendment No.9) (Miscellaneous) 1992 (S.I. 1992/2289)
 Diseases of Animals (Approved Disinfectants) (Amendment) (No. 2) Order 1992 (S.I. 1992/2290)
 Poisons List (Amendment) Order 1992 (S.I. 1992/2292)
 Poisons (Amendment) Rules 1992 (S.I. 1992/2293)
 Combined Probation Areas (Dyfed) Order 1992 (S.I. 1992/2294)

2301-2400

 A595 Trunk Road (Foxfield Diversion and Detrunking) Order 1992 (S.I. 1992/2313)
 Offshore Installations (Safety Zones) (No.3) Order 1992 (S.I. 1992/2314)
 Education (Further Education Corporations) (No. 2) Order 1992 (S.I. 1992/2315)
 Loch Morar and River Morar Protection Order 1992 (S.I. 1992/2316)
 Housing (Right to Buy) (Priority of Charges) Order 1992 (S.I. 1992/2317)
 Mortgage Indemnities (Recognised Bodies) Order 1992 (S.I. 1992/2318)
 Goods Vehicles (Operators' Licences, Qualifications and Fees) (Amendment) Regulations 1992 (S.I. 1992/2319)
 Social Fund Cold Weather Payments (General) Amendment Regulations 1992 (S.I. 1992/2322)
 British Railways (Penalty Fares) Act 1989 (Activating No.4) Order 1992 (S.I. 1992/2323)
 British Railways (Penalty Fares) Act 1989 (Activating No. 5) Order 1992 (S.I. 1992/2324)
 Insurance Companies (Pensions Business) (Transitional Provisions) Regulations 1992 (S.I. 1992/2326)
 South Ayrshire Hospitals National Health Service Trust (Appointment of Trustees) Order 1992 (S.I. 1992/2337)
 Royal Scottish National Hospital and Community National Health Service Trust (Establishment) Order 1992 (S.I. 1992/2338)
 Aberdeen Royal Hospitals National Health Service Trust (Appointment of Trustees) Order 1992 (S.I. 1992/2339)
 Seed Potatoes (Fees) (Scotland) Amendment Regulations 1992 (S.I. 1992/2340)
 Environmentally Sensitive Areas (Cambrian Mountains) Designation (Amendment No. 2) Order 1992 (S.I. 1992/2342)
 Police (Pensions and Injury Benefit) (Amendment) Regulations 1992 (S.I. 1992/2349)
 Wildlife and Countryside Act 1981 (Variation of Schedules 5 and 8) Order 1992 (S.I. 1992/2350)
 Fresh Meat and Poultry Meat (Hygiene, Inspection and Examinations for Residues) (Charges) (Amendment) Regulations 1992 (S.I. 1992/2353)
 A50 Trunk Road (Blythe Bridge to Queensway and Connecting Roads) Supplementary Order 1992 (S.I. 1992/2354)
 Charities (Receiver and Manager) Regulations 1992 (S.I. 1992/2355)
 Merchant Shipping (Categorisation of Waters) Regulations 1992 (S.I. 1992/2356)
 Merchant Shipping (Passenger Ships of Classes IV, V, VI, & VI(A) -Bridge Visibility) Regulations 1992 (S.I. 1992/2357)
 Merchant Shipping (Passenger Ship Construction and Survey) (Amendment) Regulations 1992 (S.I. 1992/2358)
 Merchant Shipping (Life-Saving Appliances for Passenger Ships of Classes III to VI (A)) Regulations 1992 (S.I. 1992/2359)
 Merchant Shipping (Fire Protection) (Amendment) Regulations 1992 (S.I. 1992/2360)
 Education (Publication of Draft Proposals and Orders) (Further Education Corporations) Regulations 1992 (S.I. 1992/2361)
 Grants to Voluntary Organisations (Specified Date) Order 1992 (S.I. 1992/2362)
 Imported Food and Feedingstuffs (Safeguards against Cholera) (Amendment) Regulations 1992 (S.I. 1992/2364)
 Fire Services (Appointments and Promotion) (Amendment) (No. 2) Regulations 1992 (S.I. 1992/2365)
 Zootechnical Standards Regulations 1992 (S.I. 1992/2370)
 Local Government Act 1992 (Commencement No.1) Order 1992 (S.I. 1992/2371)
 Electromagnetic Compatibility Regulations 1992 (S.I. 1992/2372)
 Electromagnetic Compatibility (Wireless Telegraphy Apparatus) Certification and Test Fees Regulations 1992 (S.I. 1992/2373)
 East Worcestershire Waterworks Company (Constitution and Regulation) Order 1992 (S.I. 1992/2374)
 Further and Higher Education Act 1992 (Commencement No. 2) Order 1992 (S.I. 1992/2377)
 Petroleum (Production) (Seaward Areas) (Amendment) Regulations 1992 (S.I. 1992/2378)
 National Health Service (Fund—Holding Practices) (Applications and Recognition) (Scotland) Amendment Regulations 1992 (S.I. 1992/2379)
 Ports Act 1991 (Transfer of Local Lighthouses: Appointed Day) Order 1992 (S.I. 1992/2381)
 Control of Substances Hazardous to Health (Amendment) Regulations 1992 (S.I. 1992/2382)
 United Kingdom Ecolabelling Board Regulations 1992 (S.I. 1992/2383)
 Further Education (Sponsoring Bodies) Order 1992 (S.I. 1992/2400)

2401-2500

 National Health Service (General Medical and Pharmaceutical Services) (Scotland) Amendment (No.2) Regulations 1992 (S.I. 1992/2401)
 Road Traffic Accidents (Payments for Treatment) Order 1992 (S.I. 1992/2402)
 National Health Service (General Medical Services) Amendment Regulations 1992 (S.I. 1992/2412)
 Planning and Compensation Act 1991 (Commencement No. 13 and Transitional Provision) Order 1992 (S.I. 1992/2413)
 Town and Country Planning (Simplified Planning Zones) Regulations 1992 (S.I. 1992/2414)
 Export of Dangerous Chemicals Regulations 1992 (S.I. 1992/2415)
 Telecommunications Terminal Equipment Regulations 1992 (S.I. 1992/2423)
 Local Authorities (Funds) (England) Regulations 1992 (S.I. 1992/2428)
 Billing Authorities (Alteration of Requisite Calculations) (England) Regulations 1992 (S.I. 1992/2429)
 Local Government (Compensation for Premature Retirement) (Amendment) Regulations 1992 (S.I. 1992/2432)
 M4 Motorway Castleton—Coryton (Connecting Roads, Special Roads) Scheme 1992 Confirmation Instrument 1992 (S.I. 1992/2446)
 Goods Vehicles (Plating and Testing) (Amendment) (No. 2) Regulations 1992 (S.I. 1992/2447)
 Social Fund Cold Weather Payments (General) Amendment (No.2) Regulations 1992 (S.I. 1992/2448)
 Protection of Trading Interests (US Cuban Assets Control Regulations) Order 1992 (S.I. 1992/2449)
 Town and Country Planning General Development (Amendment) (No. 6) Order 1992 (S.I. 1992/2450)
 Taxes (Interest Rate) (Amendment No. 4) Regulations 1992 (S.I. 1992/2451)
 Companies Act 1985 (Accounts of Small and Medium-Sized Enterprises and Publication of Accounts in ECUs) Regulations 1992 (S.I. 1992/2452)
 Local Government Finance Act 1992 (Commencement No. 6 and Transitional Provision) Order 1992 (S.I. 1992/2454)
 A3 Trunk Road (Wandsworth High Street, Wandsworth) (Box Junction) Order 1992 (S.I. 1992/2455)
 A259 Trunk Road (Folkestone Trunking and Detrunking) Order 1992 (S.I. 1992/2458)
 East Cheshire National Health Service Trust (Establishment) Order 1992 (S.I. 1992/2461)
 Cheshire Community Healthcare National Health Service Trust (Establishment) Order 1992 (S.I. 1992/2462)
 Countess of Chester Hospital National Health Service Trust (Establishment) Order 1992 (S.I. 1992/2463)
 Warrington Community Health Care National Health Service Trust (Establishment) Order 1992 (S.I. 1992/2464)
 Southport and Formby Community Health Services National Health Service Trust (Establishment) Order 1992 (S.I. 1992/2465)
 Halton General Hospital National Health Service Trust (Establishment) Order 1992 (S.I. 1992/2466)
 Wigan and Leigh Health Services National Health Service Trust (Establishment) Order 1992 (S.I. 1992/2467)
 West Lancashire National Health Service Trust (Establishment) Order 1992 (S.I. 1992/2468)
 Calderstones National Health Service Trust (Establishment) Order 1992 (S.I. 1992/2469)
 Chorley and South Ribble National Health Service Trust (Establishment) Order 1992 (S.I. 1992/2470)
 West Lindsey National Health Service Trust (Establishment) Order 1992 (S.I. 1992/2471)
 Leicester General Hospital National Health Service Trust (Establishment) Order 1992 (S.I. 1992/2472)
 Southern Derbyshire Mental Health National Health Service Trust (Establishment) Order 1992 (S.I. 1992/2473)
 Chesterfield and North Derbyshire Royal Hospital National Health Service Trust (Establishment) Order 1992 (S.I. 1992/2474)
 Nottinghamshire Ambulance Service National Health Service Trust (Establishment) Order 1992 (S.I. 1992/2475)
 Derby City General Hospital National Health Service Trust (Establishment) Order 1992 (S.I. 1992/2476)
 Central Nottinghamshire Healthcare National Health Service Trust (Establishment) Order 1992 (S.I. 1992/2477)
 Queen's Medical Centre, Nottingham, University Hospital National Health Service Trust (Establishment) Order 1992 (S.I. 1992/2478)
 Rotherham General Hospital's National Health Service Trust (Establishment) Order 1992 (S.I. 1992/2479)
 Barnsley District General Hospital National Health Service Trust (Establishment) Order 1992 (S.I. 1992/2480)
 Community Health Services, Southern Derbyshire National Health Service Trust (Establishment) Order 1992 (S.I. 1992/2481)
 Rotherham Priority Health Services National Health Service Trust (Establishment) Order 1992 (S.I. 1992/2482)
 Leicester Royal Infirmary National Health Service Trust (Establishment) Order 1992 (S.I. 1992/2483)
 Fosse Health, Leicestershire Community National Health Service Trust (Establishment) Order 1992 (S.I. 1992/2484)
 South Lincolnshire Community and Mental Health Services National Health Service Trust (Establishment) Order 1992 (S.I. 1992/2485)
 Glenfield Hospital National Health Service Trust (Establishment) Order 1992 (S.I. 1992/2486)
 Huddersfield Health Care Services National Health Service Trust (Establishment) Order 1992 (S.I. 1992/2487)
 Humberside Ambulance Service National Health Service Trust (Establishment) Order 1992 (S.I. 1992/2488)
 North Yorkshire Ambulance Service National Health Service Trust (Establishment) Order 1992 (S.I. 1992/2489)
 Pinderfields Hospitals National Health Service Trust (Establishment) Order 1992 (S.I. 1992/2490)
 Pontefract Hospitals National Health Service Trust (Establishment) Order 1992 (S.I. 1992/2491)
 Scunthorpe Community Health Care National Health Service Trust (Establishment) Order 1992 (S.I. 1992/2492)
 West Yorkshire Metropolitan Ambulance Service National Health Service Trust (Establishment) Order 1992 (S.I. 1992/2493)
 Scunthorpe and Goole Hospitals National Health Service Trust (Establishment) Order 1992 (S.I. 1992/2494)
 Wakefield and Pontefract Community Health National Health Service Trust (Establishment) Order 1992 (S.I. 1992/2495)
 Grimsby Health National Health Service Trust (Establishment) Order 1992 (S.I. 1992/2496)
 Leeds Community and Mental Health Services Teaching National Health Service Trust (Establishment) Order 1992 (S.I. 1992/2497)
 Calderdale Healthcare National Health Service Trust (Establishment) Order 1992 (S.I. 1992/2498)
 Royal Hull Hospitals National Health Service Trust (Establishment) Order 1992 (S.I. 1992/2499)
 East Yorkshire Hospitals National Health Service Trust (Establishment) Order 1992 (S.I. 1992/2500)

2501-2600

 North Hampshire, Loddon Community National Health Service Trust (Establishment) Order 1992 (S.I. 1992/2501)
 Isle of Wight Community Healthcare National Health Service Trust (Establishment) Order 1992 (S.I. 1992/2502)
 Wiltshire Ambulance Service National Health Service Trust (Establishment) Order 1992 (S.I. 1992/2503)
 Hampshire Ambulance Service National Health Service Trust (Establishment) Order 1992 (S.I. 1992/2504)
 Andover District Community Health Care National Health Service Trust (Establishment) Order 1992 (S.I. 1992/2505)
 Portsmouth Hospitals National Health Service Trust (Establishment) Order 1992 (S.I. 1992/2506)
 St. Mary's Hospital National Health Service Trust (Establishment) Order 1992 (S.I. 1992/2507)
 Dorset Ambulance National Health Service Trust (Establishment) Order 1992 (S.I. 1992/2508)
 Southampton University Hospitals National Health Service Trust (Establishment) Order 1992 (S.I. 1992/2509)
 Whittington Hospital National Health Service Trust (Establishment) Order 1992 (S.I. 1992/2510)
 Enfield Community Care National Health Service Trust (Establishment) Order 1992 (S.I. 1992/2511)
 Havering Hospitals National Health Service Trust (Establishment) Order 1992 (S.I. 1992/2512)
 Thameside Community Health Care National Health Service Trust (Establishment) Order 1992 (S.I. 1992/2513)
 Mid Essex Community Health National Health Service Trust (Establishment) Order 1992 (S.I. 1992/2514)
 BHB Community Health Care National Health Service Trust (Establishment) Order 1992 (S.I. 1992/2515)
 Chase Farm Hospitals National Health Service Trust (Establishment) Order 1992 (S.I. 1992/2516)
 Redbridge Health Care National Health Service Trust (Establishment) Order 1992 (S.I. 1992/2517)
 Royal London Homoeopathic Hospital National Health Service Trust (Establishment) Order 1992 (S.I. 1992/2518)
 Camden and Islington Community Health Services National Health Service Trust (Establishment) Order 1992 (S.I. 1992/2519)
 Worthing Priority Care National Health Service Trust (Establishment) Order 1992 (S.I. 1992/2520)
 Crawley Horsham National Health Service Trust (Establishment) Order 1992 (S.I. 1992/2521)
 East Surrey Hospital and Community Healthcare National Health Service Trust (Establishment) Order 1992 (S.I. 1992/2522)
 Richmond, Twickenham and Roehampton Healthcare National Health Service Trust (Establishment) Order 1992 (S.I. 1992/2523)
 Merton and Sutton Community National Health Service Trust (Establishment) Order 1992 (S.I. 1992/2524)
 Severn National Health Service Trust (Establishment) Order 1992 (S.I. 1992/2525)
 Royal Devon and Exeter Healthcare National Health Service Trust (Establishment) Order 1992 (S.I. 1992/2526)
 Gloucestershire Royal National Health Service Trust (Establishment) Order 1992 (S.I. 1992/2527)
 Thanet Health Care National Health Service Trust (Establishment) Order 1992 (S.I. 1992/2528)
 Canterbury and Thanet Community Healthcare National Health Service Trust (Establishment) Order 1992 (S.I. 1992/2529)
 Queen Mary's Sidcup National Health Service Trust (Establishment) Order 1992 (S.I. 1992/2530)
 Mid Kent Healthcare National Health Service Trust (Establishment) Order 1992 (S.I. 1992/2531)
 Kent and Canterbury Hospitals National Health Service Trust (Establishment) Order 1992 (S.I. 1992/2532)
 Greenwich Healthcare National Health Service Trust (Establishment) Order 1992 (S.I. 1992/2533)
 Eastbourne and County Healthcare National Health Service Trust (Establishment) Order 1992 (S.I. 1992/2534)
 Bromley Hospitals National Health Service Trust (Establishment) Order 1992 (S.I. 1992/2535)
 Brighton Health Care National Health Service Trust (Establishment) Order 1992 (S.I. 1992/2536)
 Northwick Park Hospital National Health Service Trust (Establishment) Order 1992 (S.I. 1992/2537)
 Bedfordshire and Hertfordshire Ambulance and Paramedic Service National Health Service Trust (Establishment) Order 1992 (S.I. 1992/2538)
 West London Healthcare National Health Service Trust (Establishment) Order 1992 (S.I. 1992/2539)
 Hounslow and Spelthorne Community and Mental Health National Health Service Trust (Establishment) Order 1992 (S.I. 1992/2540)
 Riverside Mental Health National Health Service Trust (Establishment) Order 1992 (S.I. 1992/2541)
 Northumberland Mental Health National Health Service Trust (Establishment) Order 1992 (S.I. 1992/2542)
 South Tyneside Health Care National Health Service Trust (Establishment) Order 1992 (S.I. 1992/2543)
 South Cumbria Community and Mental Health National Health Service Trust (Establishment) Order 1992 (S.I. 1992/2544)
 Durham County Ambulance Service National Health Service Trust (Establishment) Order 1992 (S.I. 1992/2545)
 Cumbria Ambulance Service National Health Service Trust (Establishment) Order 1992 (S.I. 1992/2546)
 South West Durham Mental Health National Health Service Trust (Establishment) Order 1992 (S.I. 1992/2547)
 Westmorland Hospitals National Health Service Trust (Establishment) Order 1992 (S.I. 1992/2548)
 West Cumbria Health Care National Health Service Trust (Establishment) Order 1992 (S.I. 1992/2549)
 Gateshead Hospitals National Health Service Trust (Establishment) Order 1992 (S.I. 1992/2550)
 South Tees Community and Mental Health National Health Service Trust (Establishment) Order 1992 (S.I. 1992/2551)
 North Warwickshire National Health Service Trust (Establishment) Order 1992 (S.I. 1992/2552)
 Walsall Community Health National Health Service Trust (Establishment) Order 1992 (S.I. 1992/2553)
 Princess Royal Hospital National Health Service Trust (Establishment) Order 1992 (S.I. 1992/2554)
 South Worcestershire Community National Health Service Trust (Establishment) Order 1992 (S.I. 1992/2555)
 South Warwickshire General Hospitals National Health Service Trust (Establishment) Order 1992 (S.I. 1992/2556)
 Shropshire's Mental Health National Health Service Trust (Establishment) Order 1992 (S.I. 1992/2557)
 Mid—Staffordshire General Hospitals National Health Service Trust (Establishment) Order 1992 (S.I. 1992/2558)
 North Staffordshire Hospital Centre National Health Service Trust (Establishment) Order 1992 (S.I. 1992/2559)
 Kidderminster Health Care National Health Service Trust (Establishment) Order 1992 (S.I. 1992/2560)
 Wolverley National Health Service Trust (Establishment) Order 1992 (S.I. 1992/2561)
 Good Hope Hospital National Health Service Trust (Establishment) Order 1992 (S.I. 1992/2562)
 Burton Hospitals National Health Service Trust (Establishment) Order 1992 (S.I. 1992/2563)
 North East Worcestershire Community HealthCare National Health Service Trust (Establishment) Order 1992 (S.I. 1992/2564)
 West Suffolk Hospitals National Health Service Trust (Establishment) Order 1992 (S.I. 1992/2565)
 Ipswich Hospital National Health Service Trust (Establishment) Order 1992 (S.I. 1992/2566)
 Addenbrooke's National Health Service Trust (Establishment) Order 1992 (S.I. 1992/2567)
 Papworth Hospital National Health Service Trust (Establishment) Order 1992 (S.I. 1992/2568)
 James Paget Hospital National Health Service Trust (Establishment) Order 1992 (S.I. 1992/2569)
 North West Anglia Health Care National Health Service Trust (Establishment) Order 1992 (S.I. 1992/2570)
 Lifespan Health Care Cambridge National Health Service Trust (Establishment) Order 1992 (S.I. 1992/2571)
 Peterborough Hospitals National Health Service Trust (Establishment) Order 1992 (S.I. 1992/2572)
 Mid Anglia Community Health National Health Service Trust (Establishment) Order 1992 (S.I. 1992/2573)
 Oxfordshire Learning Disability National Health Service Trust (Establishment) Order 1992 (S.I. 1992/2574)
 South Buckinghamshire National Health Service Trust (Establishment) Order 1992 (S.I. 1992/2575)
 Horton General Hospital National Health Service Trust (Establishment) Order 1992 (S.I. 1992/2576)
 Two Shires Ambulance National Health Service Trust (Establishment) Order 1992 (S.I. 1992/2577)
 Royal Berkshire Ambulance National Health Service Trust (Establishment) Order 1992 (S.I. 1992/2578)
 Royal Berkshire and Battle Hospitals National Health Service Trust (Establishment) Order 1992 (S.I. 1992/2579)
 Radcliffe Infirmary National Health Service Trust (Establishment) Order 1992 (S.I. 1992/2580)
 West Berkshire Priority Care Service National Health Service Trust (Establishment) Order 1992 (S.I. 1992/2581)
 East Berkshire Community Health National Health Service Trust (Establishment) Order 1992 (S.I. 1992/2582)
 East Suffolk Local Health Services National Health Service Trust (Establishment) Order 1992 (S.I. 1992/2583)
 Southampton Community Health Services National Health Service Trust (Establishment) Order 1992 (S.I. 1992/2584)
 West Middlesex University Hospital National Health Service Trust (Establishment) Order 1992 (S.I. 1992/2585)
 Mancunian Community Health National Health Service Trust (Establishment) Order 1992 (S.I. 1992/2586)
 Bedford and Shires Health and Care National Health Service Trust (Establishment) Order 1992 (S.I. 1992/2587)
 Avalon, Somerset, National Health Service Trust (Establishment) Order 1992 (S.I. 1992/2588)
 British Railways (Penalty Fares) Act 1989 (Activating No. 6) Order 1992 (S.I. 1992/2589)
 Olive Oil (Marketing Standards) (Amendment) Regulations 1992 (S.I. 1992/2590)
 Artificial Insemination (Cattle and Pigs) (Fees) (Amendment) Regulations 1992 (S.I. 1992/2592)
 A4 Trunk Road (Avonmouth Relief Road) Order 1992 (S.I. 1992/2593)
 M5 Motorway (Junction 18 and Avonmouth Relief Road) (Slip Roads, Special Roads) Scheme 1992 (S.I. 1992/2594)
 Social Security (Miscellaneous Provisions) Amendment (No. 2) Regulations 1992 (S.I. 1992/2595)
 Food (Forces Exemptions) (Revocations) Regulations 1992 (S.I. 1992/2596)
 Food Safety (Amendment) (Metrication) Regulations 1992 (S.I. 1992/2597)
 Education (Parental Ballots for Acquisition of Grant-maintained Status) (Prescribed Body) Regulations 1992 (S.I. 1992/2598)
 Borough of Blaenau Gwent (Electoral Arrangements) Order 1992 (S.I. 1992/2600)

2601-2700

 Environmental Protection Act 1990 (Modification of section 112) Regulations 1992 (S.I. 1992/2617)
 Merger Situation (Medicopharma NV and AAH Holdings plc) (Interim Provision) (Revocation) Order 1992 (S.I. 1992/2619)
 Child Resistant Packaging and Tactile Danger Warnings (Safety) (Revocation) Regulations 1992 (S.I. 1992/2620)
 Import and Export (Plant Health Fees) (Scotland) Order 1992 (S.I. 1992/2621)
 Education (Designated Institutions) (Wales) Order 1992 (S.I. 1992/2622)
 Customs Duties (ECSC) (Amendment No. 8) Order 1992 (S.I. 1992/2623)
 Sea Fish Licensing Order 1992 (S.I. 1992/2633)
 Seed Potatoes (Fees) (Scotland) (No.2) Regulations 1992 (S.I. 1992/2634)
 Child Support Commissioners (Procedure) Regulations 1992 (S.I. 1992/2640)
 Child Support Appeal Tribunals (Procedure) Regulations 1992 (S.I. 1992/2641)
 Finance (No. 2) Act 1992, section 62, (Commencement) Order 1992 (S.I. 1992/2642)
 Child Support (Collection and Enforcement of Other Forms of Maintenance) Regulations 1992 (S.I. 1992/2643)
 Child Support Act 1991 (Commencement No. 3 and Transitional Provisions) Order 1992 (S.I. 1992/2644)
 Child Support (Maintenance Arrangements and Jurisdiction) Regulations 1992 (S.I. 1992/2645)
 Gaming Act (Variation of Monetary Limits) (No. 3) Order 1992 (S.I. 1992/2646)
 Gaming Act (Variation of Monetary Limits) (No. 4) Order 1992 (S.I. 1992/2647)
 Gaming (Small Charges) Order 1992 (S.I. 1992/2648)
 Teachers' Superannuation (Additional Voluntary Contributions) (Scotland) Regulations 1992 (S.I. 1992/2649)
 M65 Motorway (Bamber Bridge to Whitebirk Section, Blackburn Southern Bypass) and Connecting Roads Scheme 1991 Variation Scheme 1992 (S.I. 1992/2651)
 Legal Advice and Assistance (Amendment) (No. 3) Regulations 1992 (S.I. 1992/2654)
 International Organisations (Miscellaneous Exemptions) Order 1992 (S.I. 1992/2655)
 Scottish Land Court Rules 1992 (S.I. 1992/2656)
 European Communities (Designation) (No. 3) Order 1992 (S.I. 1992/2661)
 Child Abduction and Custody (Parties to Conventions) (Amendment) (No. 4) Order 1992 (S.I. 1992/2662)
 European Convention on Extradition (Czech and Slovak Federative Republic) (Amendment) Order 1992 (S.I. 1992/2663)
 Judicial Committee (The Eastern Caribbean Supreme Court) Order 1992 (S.I. 1992/2664)
 Judicial Committee (Jamaica) Order 1992 (S.I. 1992/2665)
 Merchant Shipping (Confirmation of Legislation) (Cayman Islands) (No. 2) Order 1992 (S.I. 1992/2666)
 Merchant Shipping (Confirmation of Legislation) (Cayman Islands) (No. 3) Order 1992 (S.I. 1992/2667)
 Merchant Shipping (Prevention and Control of Pollution) (Bermuda) Order 1992 (S.I. 1992/2668)
 Consular Fees (Amendment) Order 1992 (S.I. 1992/2669)
 Criminal Justice Act 1982 (Isle of Man) Order 1992 (S.I. 1992/2670)
 Pharmaceutical Services (Northern Ireland) Order 1992 (S.I. 1992/2671)
 Patents, Designs and Marks (Chile, Gambia, Hong Kong, Italy, Japan, Lesotho and Swaziland) (Convention and Relevant Countries) Order 1992 (S.I. 1992/2672)
 Civil Aviation (Personnel Licences) Order 1992 (S.I. 1992/2673)
 Wildlife and Countryside Act 1981 (Variation of Schedule) (No. 2) Order 1992 (S.I. 1992/2674)
 A63 Trunk Road (Barnhill Lane, Howden Junction Improvement) Order 1992 (S.I. 1992/2675)
 Sheep Annual Premium Regulations 1992 (S.I. 1992/2677)
 International Carriage of Perishable Foodstuffs (Amendment) Regulations 1992 (S.I. 1992/2682)
 Town and Country Planning (Crown Land Applications) Regulations 1992 (S.I. 1992/2683)
 Medicines (Prohibition of Non-medicinal Antimicrobial Substances) (Amendment) Order 1992 (S.I. 1992/2684)

2701-2800

 Broadgreen Hospital National Health Service Trust (Transfer of Trust Property) Order 1992 (S.I. 1992/2720)
 Cardiothoracic Centre — Liverpool National Health Service Trust (Transfer of Trust Property) Order 1992 (S.I. 1992/2721)
 Royal Liverpool University Hospital National Health Service Trust (Transfer of Trust Property) Order 1992 (S.I. 1992/2722)
 Royal Liverpool Children's Hospital and Community Services National Health Service Trust (Transfer of Trust Property) (No.2) Order 1992 (S.I. 1992/2723)
 Liverpool Obstetric and Gynaecology Services National Health Service Trust (Transfer of Trust Property) Order 1992 (S.I. 1992/2724)
 Food Protection (Emergency Prohibitions) (Lead in Ducks and Geese) (England) Order 1992 (S.I. 1992/2726)
 Gwent Community Health National Health Service Trust (Establishment) Order 1992 (S.I. 1992/2730)
 Wrexham Maelor Hospital National Health Service Trust (Establishment) Order 1992 (S.I. 1992/2731)
 Glan Clwyd District General Hospital National Health Service Trust (Establishment) Order 1992 (S.I. 1992/2732)
 Glan Hafren National Health Service Trust (Establishment) Order 1992 (S.I. 1992/2733)
 Llanelli Dinefwr National Health Service Trust (Establishment) Order 1992 (S.I. 1992/2734)
 Ceredigion and Mid Wales National Health Service Trust (Establishment) Order 1992 (S.I. 1992/2735)
 Swansea National Health Service Trust (Establishment) Order 1992 (S.I. 1992/2736)
 Llandough Hospital National Health Service Trust (Establishment) Order 1992 (S.I. 1992/2737)
 Bridgend and District National Health Service Trust (Establishment) Order 1992 (S.I. 1992/2738)
 Gofal Cymuned Clwydian Community Care National Health Service Trust (Establishment) Order 1992 (S.I. 1992/2739)
 South and East Wales Ambulance National Health Service Trust (Establishment) Order 1992 (S.I. 1992/2740)
 Powys Health Care National Health Service Trust (Establishment) Order 1992 (S.I. 1992/2741)
 Carmarthen and District National Health Service Trust (Establishment) Order 1992 (S.I. 1992/2742)
 Atomic Weapons Establishment (Designation and Appointed Day) Order 1992 (S.I. 1992/2743)
 Income Tax (Insurance Companies) (Expenses of Management) Regulations 1992 (S.I. 1992/2744)
 Finance Act 1985 (Interest on Tax) (Prescribed Rate) Order 1992 (S.I. 1992/2745)
 Mackerel (Specified Sea Areas) (Prohibition of Fishing) Order 1992 (S.I. 1992/2746)
 Building Societies (Aggregation) (Amendment) Rules 1992 (S.I. 1992/2748)
 River Ugie Salmon Fishery District (Baits and Lures) Regulations 1992 (S.I. 1992/2749)
 River Girvan Salmon Fishery District (Baits and Lures) Regulations 1992 (S.I. 1992/2750)
 National Health Service (Determination of Districts) (No. 4) Order 1992 (S.I. 1992/2751)
 National Health Service (District Health Authorities) (No. 4) Order 1992 (S.I. 1992/2752)
 Registration of Births and Deaths (Amendment) Regulations 1992 (S.I. 1992/2753)
 Gaming Act (Variation of Monetary Limits) (Scotland) (No. 2) Order 1992 (S.I. 1992/2754)
 Gaming (Small Charges) (Scotland) Order 1992 (S.I. 1992/2755)
 Criminal Appeal (Amendment) Rules 1992 (S.I. 1992/2757)
 Essex Ambulance Service National Health Service Trust (Transfer of Trust Property) Order 1992 (S.I. 1992/2758)
 Christie Hospital National Health Service Trust (Transfer of Trust Property) Order 1992 (S.I. 1992/2759)
 Mid Essex Hospital Services National Health Service Trust (Transfer of Trust Property) Order 1992 (S.I. 1992/2760)
 Kingston Hospital National Health Service Trust (Transfer of Trust Property) Order 1992 (S.I. 1992/2761)
 County Court Fees (Amendment) Order 1992 (S.I. 1992/2762)
 Milk and Dairies and Milk (Special Designation) (Charges) (Amendment) Regulations 1992 (S.I. 1992/2763)
 Blue Eared Pig Disease (Revocation) Order 1992 (S.I. 1992/2764)
 Food Safety Act 1990 (Consequential Modifications) (Local Enactments) (No. 2) Order 1992 (S.I. 1992/2766)
 Cigarettes (Maximum Tar Yield) (Safety) Regulations 1992 (S.I. 1992/2783)
 Transport and Works Act 1992 (Commencement No. 3 and Transitional Provisions) Order 1992 (S.I. 1992/2784)
 Transport Levying Bodies Regulations 1992 (S.I. 1992/2789)
 Statistics of Trade (Customs and Excise) Regulations 1992 (S.I. 1992/2790)
 Health and Safety (Display Screen Equipment) Regulations 1992 (S.I. 1992/2792)
 Manual Handling Operations Regulations 1992 (S.I. 1992/2793)
 Council Tax (Exempt Dwellings) (Scotland) Amendment Order 1992 (S.I. 1992/2796)

2801-2900

 Police and Criminal Evidence Act 1984 (Commencement No. 5) Order 1992 (S.I. 1992/2802)
 Police and Criminal Evidence Act 1984 (Tape- recording of Interviews) (No. 2) Order 1992 (S.I. 1992/2803)
 Income Support (General) Amendment (No. 3) Regulations 1992 (S.I. 1992/2804)
 A423 North of Oxford-South of Coventry Trunk Road (Kidlington to Cutteslowe Section) De-Trunking Order 1992 (S.I. 1992/2805)
 A43 Oxford-Market Deeping Trunk Road (Peartree Hill Roundabout to Gosford Section) De-Trunking Order 1992 (S.I. 1992/2806)
 Cheshire County Council (Arpley New Bridge, Warrington) Scheme 1989 Confirmation Instrument 1992 (S.I. 1992/2808)
 A47 Trunk Road (Walpole Highway and Tilney High End Bypass and Slip Roads) Order 1992 (S.I. 1992/2809)
 A47 Trunk Road (Walpole Highway and Tilney High End Bypass Detrunking) Order 1992 (S.I. 1992/2810)
 Smoke Control Areas (Exempted Fireplaces) Order 1992 (S.I. 1992/2811)
 Smallholdings (Full-Time Employment) (Amendment) Regulations 1992 (S.I. 1992/2816)
 Transport and Works (Inquiries Procedure) Rules 1992 (S.I. 1992/2817)
 Taxes (Interest Rate) (Amendment No.5) Regulations 1992 (S.I. 1992/2818)
 Local Authorities (Capital Finance) (Amendment) (No.3) Regulations 1992 (S.I. 1992/2819)
 Passenger Transport Executives (Capital Finance) (Temporary Provision) Order 1992 (S.I. 1992/2820)
 Firearms (Scotland) Amendment Rules 1992 (S.I. 1992/2821)
 Haddock (Specified Sea Areas) (Prohibition of Fishing) (No. 2) Order 1992 (S.I. 1992/2822)
 Firearms Acts (Amendment) Regulations 1992 (S.I. 1992/2823)
 Firearms (Amendment) Rules 1992 (S.I. 1992/2824)
 Local Authorities (Goods and Services) (Public Bodies) Order 1992 (S.I. 1992/2830)
 Planning and Compensation Act 1991 (Commencement No. 14 and Transitional Provision) Order 1992 (S.I. 1992/2831)
 Town and Country Planning (Modification and Discharge of Planning Obligations) Regulations 1992 (S.I. 1992/2832)
 Estate Agents (Specified Offences) (No. 2) (Amendment) Order 1992 (S.I. 1992/2833)
 Property Misdescriptions (Specified Matters) Order 1992 (S.I. 1992/2834)
 Savings Certificates (Amendment) Regulations 1992 (S.I. 1992/2835)
 Aintree Hospitals National Health Service Trust (Transfer of Trust Property) Order 1992 (S.I. 1992/2836)
 East Somerset National Health Service Trust (Transfer of Trust Property) Order 1992 (S.I. 1992/2837)
 Mersey Regional Ambulance Service National Health Service Trust (Transfer of Trust Property) Order 1992 (S.I. 1992/2838)
 North Mersey Community National Health Service Trust (Transfer of Trust Property) Order 1992 (S.I. 1992/2839)
 Taunton and Somerset National Health Service Trust (Transfer of Trust Property) Order 1992 (S.I. 1992/2840)
 Walton Centre for Neurology and Neurosurgery National Health Service Trust (Transfer of Trust Property) Order 1992 (S.I. 1992/2841)
 Road Traffic Offenders (Prescribed Devices) (No. 2) Order 1992 (S.I. 1992/2843)
 Medicines (Exemption from Licensing) (Radiopharmaceuticals) Order 1992 (S.I. 1992/2844)
 Medicines (Manufacturer's Undertakings for Imported Products) Amendment Regulations 1992 (S.I. 1992/2845)
 Medicines (Standard Provisions for Licences and Certificates) Amendment Regulations 1992 (S.I. 1992/2846)
 Hake (Specified Sea Areas) (Prohibition of Fishing) Order 1992 (S.I. 1992/2847)
 Offshore Installations (Safety Zones) (No. 4) Order 1992 (S.I. 1992/2852)
 Insurance Brokers Registration Council (Indemnity Insurance and Grants Scheme) (Amendment) Rules Approval Order 1992 (S.I. 1992/2866)
 Closure of Prisons (H.M. Young Offender Institution Lowdham Grange) Order 1992 (S.I. 1992/2867)
 Value Added Tax (General) (Amendment) (No. 3) Regulations 1992 (S.I. 1992/2868)
 Social Security (Disability Living Allowance and Attendance Allowance) (Amendment) Regulations 1992 (S.I. 1992/2869)
 European Communities (Designation) (No. 4) Order 1992 (S.I. 1992/2870)
 European Communities (Definition of Treaties) (Europe Agreement establishing an Association between the European Communities and their Member States and the Republic of Hungary) Order 1992 (S.I. 1992/2871)
 European Communities (Definition of Treaties) (Europe Agreement establishing an Association between the European Communities and their Member States and the Republic of Poland) Order 1992 (S.I. 1992/2872)
 Criminal Justice (International Co-operation) Act 1990 (Modification) Order 1992 (S.I. 1992/2873)
 Legal Advice and Assistance (Scope) (Amendment) Regulations 1992 (S.I. 1992/2874)
 Telecommunications (Single Emergency Call Number) Regulations 1992 (S.I. 1992/2875)
 Companies (Fees) (Amendment) Regulations 1992 (S.I. 1992/2876)
 Faculty Jurisdiction Rules 1992 (S.I. 1992/2882)
 Ecclesiastical Judges and Legal Officers (Fees) Order 1992 (S.I. 1992/2883)
 Faculty Jurisdiction (Injunctions and Restoration Orders) Rules 1992 (S.I. 1992/2884)
 Offshore Installations (Safety Case) Regulations 1992 (S.I. 1992/2885)
 Insurance Companies (Amendment) Regulations 1992 (S.I. 1992/2890)
 Premium Savings Bonds (Amendment) Regulations 1992 (S.I. 1992/2891)
 National Savings Bank (Amendment) Regulations 1992 (S.I. 1992/2892)

2901-3000

 Transport and Works (Applications and Objections Procedure) Rules 1992 (S.I. 1992/2902)
 Levying Bodies (General) Regulations 1992 (S.I. 1992/2903)
 Local Authorities (Calculation of Council Tax Base) (Supply of Information) Regulations 1992 (S.I. 1992/2904)
 National Health Service Trusts (Consultation on Dissolution) Amendment Regulations 1992 (S.I. 1992/2905)
 Motor Vehicles (Type Approval) (Great Britain) (Amendment) (No. 3) Regulations 1992 (S.I. 1992/2908)
 Road Vehicles (Construction and Use) (Amendment) (No. 6) Regulations 1992 (S.I. 1992/2909)
 Social Security (Unemployment, Sickness and Invalidity Benefit) Amendment Regulations 1992 (S.I. 1992/2913)
 Controlled Drugs (Substances Useful for Manufacture) (Amendment) Regulations 1992 (S.I. 1992/2914)
 Income Tax (Building Societies) (Dividends and Interest) (Amendment No. 2) Regulations 1992 (S.I. 1992/2915)
 A69 Trunk Road (Brampton Bypass Link Road) (De-Trunking) Order 1992 (S.I. 1992/2916)
 Suckler Cow Premium (Amendment No. 3) Regulations 1992 (S.I. 1992/2918)
 Meat Hygiene Appeals Tribunal (Procedure) Regulations 1992 (S.I. 1992/2921)
 A59 Preston New Road (Samlesbury) Order 1992 (S.I. 1992/2922)
 Borough of Ynys Môn—Isle of Anglesey (Electoral Arrangements) Order 1992 (S.I. 1992/2923)
 Local Authorities (Funds) (Wales) Regulations 1992 (S.I. 1992/2929)
 Building Societies (Liquid Asset) (Amendment) Regulations 1992 (S.I. 1992/2930)
 Building Societies (Limits on Lending) Order 1992 (S.I. 1992/2931)
 Provision and Use of Work Equipment Regulations 1992 (S.I. 1992/2932)
 National Health Service (General Medical and Pharmaceutical Services) (Scotland) Amendment (No. 3) Regulations 1992 (S.I. 1992/2933)
 Water Byelaws (Milngavie Waterworks, Loch Katrine, Loch Arklet, Glen Finglas) Extension Order 1992 (S.I. 1992/2934)
 Sea Fishing (Enforcement of Community Conservation Measures) (Amendment) (No. 5) Order 1992 (S.I. 1992/2936)
 Medicines (Products Other Than Veterinary Drugs) (Prescription Only) Amendment (No. 2) Order 1992 (S.I. 1992/2937)
 Medicines (Sale or Supply) (Miscellaneous Provisions) Amendment Regulations 1992 (S.I. 1992/2938)
 Medicines (Pharmacies) (Applications for Registration and Fees) Amendment Regulations 1992 (S.I. 1992/2939)
 Council Tax (Exempt Dwellings) (Amendment) Order 1992 (S.I. 1992/2941)
 Council Tax (Additional Provisions for Discount Disregards) (Amendment) Regulations 1992 (S.I. 1992/2942)
 Local Authorities (Calculation of Council Tax Base) (Amendment) (No. 2) Regulations 1992 (S.I. 1992/2943)
 British Railways (Penalty Fares) Act 1989 (Activating No. 7) Order 1992 (S.I. 1992/2945)
 County Council of Norfolk (River Wissey Bridge) Scheme 1992 Confirmation Instrument 1992 (S.I. 1992/2953)
 Gaming Machine Licence Duty (Variation of Monetary Limits and Exemptions) Order 1992 (S.I. 1992/2954)
 Council Tax (Dwellings and Part Residential Subjects) (Scotland) Regulations 1992 (S.I. 1992/2955)
 Costs in Criminal Cases (General) (Amendment) (No. 2) Regulations 1992 (S.I. 1992/2956)
 River Roach Oyster Fishery Order 1992 (S.I. 1992/2957)
 Electricity Supply (Amendment) Regulations 1992 (S.I. 1992/2961)
 Newport—Shrewsbury Trunk Road (A4042) (Llantarnam By-Pass) Order 1992 (S.I. 1992/2962)
 Mackerel (Specified Sea Areas) (Prohibition of Fishing) (No. 2) Order 1992 (S.I. 1992/2963)
 Act of Sederunt (Proceedings in the Sheriff Court under the Debtors (Scotland) Act 1987) (Amendment) 1992 (S.I. 1992/2964)
 Personal Protective Equipment at Work Regulations 1992 (S.I. 1992/2966)
 Leeds City Council (Crown Point Bridge Improvement) Scheme 1992 Confirmation Instrument 1992 (S.I. 1992/2967)
 Fire Services (Appointments and Promotion) (Scotland) Amendment (No.2) Regulations 1992 (S.I. 1992/2971)
 Child Benefit (Residence and Persons Abroad) Amendment Regulations 1992 (S.I. 1992/2972)
 Health and Social Services and Social Security Adjudications Act 1983 (Commencement No. 6) Order 1992 (S.I. 1992/2974)
 National Health Service and Community Care Act 1990 (Commencement No. 10) Order 1992 (S.I. 1992/2975)
 Community Care (Residential Accommodation) Act 1992 (Commencement) Order 1992 (S.I. 1992/2976)
 National Assistance (Assessment of Resources) Regulations 1992 (S.I. 1992/2977)
 Occupational Pensions (Revaluation) Order 1992 (S.I. 1992/2978)
 Finance (No. 2) Act 1992 (Commencement No. 2 and Transitional Provisions) Order 1992 (S.I. 1992/2979)
 Charities (Qualified Surveyors' Reports) Regulations 1992 (S.I. 1992/2980)
 Registration of Births, Deaths and Marriages (Fees) (No. 2) Order 1992 (S.I. 1992/2982)
 New Roads and Street Works Act 1991 (Commencement No. 5 and Transitional Provisions and Savings) Order 1992 (S.I. 1992/2984)
 Street Works (Registers, Notices, Directions and Designations) Regulations 1992 (S.I. 1992/2985)
 Charity Commissioners' Fees (Copies and Extracts) Regulations 1992 (S.I. 1992/2986)
 New Roads and Street Works Act 1991 (Commencement No.6 and Transitional Provisions and Savings) (Scotland) Order 1992 (S.I. 1992/2990)
 Road Works (Registers, Notices, Directions and Designations) (Scotland) Regulations 1992 (S.I. 1992/2991)
 Licensing of Air Carriers Regulations 1992 (S.I. 1992/2992)
 Access for Community Air Carriers to Intra- Community Air Routes Regulations 1992 (S.I. 1992/2993)
 Air Fares Regulations 1992 (S.I. 1992/2994)
 Local Government Act 1988 (Defined Activities) (Exemption) (Staffordshire Moorlands District Council) Order 1992 (S.I. 1992/2995)
 Local Government Finance (Payments) (English Authorities) Regulations 1992 (S.I. 1992/2996)
 Public Information for Radiation Emergencies Regulations 1992 (S.I. 1992/2997)

3001-3100

 Education (Further Education Corporations) (No. 3) Order 1992 (S.I. 1992/3001)
 Social Security (Claims and Payments) Amendment (No. 2) Regulations 1992 (S.I. 1992/3002)
 Companies Act 1985 (Amendment of Sections 250 and 251) Regulations 1992 (S.I. 1992/3003)
 Workplace (Health, Safety and Welfare) Regulations 1992 (S.I. 1992/3004)
 Land Registration (Charities) Rules 1992 (S.I. 1992/3005)
 Companies (Forms) (Amendment) Regulations 1992 (S.I. 1992/3006)
 Council Tax (Administration and Enforcement) (Amendment) Regulations 1992 (S.I. 1992/3008)
 Local Government Act 1988 (Defined Activities) (Exemption) (Stockport Borough Council) Order 1992 (S.I. 1992/3009)
 Wildlife and Countryside Act 1981 (Variation of Schedules 2 and 3) Order 1992 (S.I. 1992/3010)
 Port of London Authority Harbour Revision Order 1992 (S.I. 1992/3011)
 Road Traffic (Courses for Drink-Drive Offenders) Regulations 1992 (S.I. 1992/3013)
 Courses for Drink-Drive Offenders (Designation of Areas) Order 1992 (S.I. 1992/3014)
 Finance Act 1985 (Interest on Tax) (Prescribed Rate) (No. 2) Order 1992 (S.I. 1992/3015)
 Gaming Act (Variation of Monetary Limits) (Scotland) (No.3) Order 1992 (S.I. 1992/3022)
 Council Tax (Prescribed Class of Dwellings) (Wales) Regulations 1992 (S.I. 1992/3023)
 Local Government (District Council Tax) (Scotland) Regulations 1992 (S.I. 1992/3024)
 Local Government Superannuation (Scotland) Amendment Regulations 1992 (S.I. 1992/3025)
 Cambridgeshire and Suffolk (County Boundaries) Order 1992 (S.I. 1992/3026)
 Bass (Specified Areas) (Prohibition of Fishing) (Variation) Order 1992 (S.I. 1992/3027)
 Combined Probation Areas (West Yorkshire) Order 1992 (S.I. 1992/3028)
 Motor Vehicles (Compulsory Insurance) Regulations 1992 (S.I. 1992/3036)
 Weighing Equipment (Non-automatic Weighing Machines) (Amendment) Regulations 1992 (S.I. 1992/3037)
 Wash Fishery Order 1992 (S.I. 1992/3038)
 Civil Aviation (Joint Financing) (Fourth Amendment) Regulations 1992 (S.I. 1992/3039)
 Civil Aviation (Route Charges for Navigation Services) (Fifth Amendment) Regulations 1992 (S.I. 1992/3040)
 Social Security Benefit (Dependency) Amendment Regulations 1992 (S.I. 1992/3041)
 Construction Plant and Equipment (Harmonisation of Noise Emission Standards) (Extension to Northern Ireland) Regulations 1992 (S.I. 1992/3043)
 Horses (Free Access to Competitions) Regulations 1992 (S.I. 1992/3044)
 Horses (Zootechnical Standards) Regulations 1992 (S.I. 1992/3045)
 National Health Service (Superannuation, Premature Retirement and Injury Benefits) (Scotland) Amendment Regulations 1992 (S.I. 1992/3046)
 Police Cadets (Scotland) Amendment (No.2) Regulations 1992 (S.I. 1992/3047)
 Industrial Training (Construction Board) Order 1964 (Amendment) Order 1992 (S.I. 1992/3048)
 Public Lending Right Scheme 1982 (Commencement of Variation) Order 1992 (S.I. 1992/3049)
 Durham, Northumberland and Tyne and Wear (County and District Boundaries) Order 1992 (S.I. 1992/3050)
 Town and Country Planning (Fees for Applications and Deemed Applications) (Amendment) (No. 2) Regulations 1992 (S.I. 1992/3052)
 Street Works (Notices) Order 1992 (S.I. 1992/3053)
 Durham and Tyne and Wear (County and District Boundaries) Order 1992 (S.I. 1992/3054)
 Northumberland and Tyne and Wear (County and District Boundaries) Order 1992 (S.I. 1992/3055)
 Public Airport Companies (Capital Finance) (Third Amendment) Order 1992 (S.I. 1992/3056)
 Further and Higher Education Act 1992 (Commencement No. 2) Order 1992 (S.I. 1992/3057)
 Animals (Scientific Procedures) Act (Fees) Order 1992 (S.I. 1992/3058)
 Local Government Act 1988 (Defined Activities) (Competition) (Tunbridge Wells Borough Council) Regulations 1992 (S.I. 1992/3059)
 Railways Regulations 1992 (S.I. 1992/3060)
 Non-Domestic Rating Contributions (Scotland) Regulations 1992 (S.I. 1992/3061)
 Road Works (Reinstatement) (Scotland) Amendment Regulations 1992 (S.I. 1992/3062)
 Road Works (Notices) (Scotland) Order 1992 (S.I. 1992/3063)
 Education (University Commissioners) Order 1992 (S.I. 1992/3064)
 Value Added Tax (Motor Vehicles for the Handicapped) Order 1992 (S.I. 1992/3065)
 Corporation Tax Acts (Provisions for Payment of Tax and Returns) (Appointed Days) Order 1992 (S.I. 1992/3066)
 Asbestos (Prohibitions) Regulations 1992 (S.I. 1992/3067)
 Control of Asbestos at Work (Amendment) Regulations 1992 (S.I. 1992/3068)
 School Teachers' Remuneration, Professional Duties and Working Time Order 1992 (S.I. 1992/3069)
 School Teachers' Pay and Conditions Act 1991 (Commencement No. 4) Order 1992 (S.I. 1992/3070)
 Civil Courts (Amendment No. 4) Order 1992 (S.I. 1992/3071)
 Public Record Office (Fees) Regulations 1992 (S.I. 1992/3072)
 Supply of Machinery (Safety) Regulations 1992 (S.I. 1992/3073)
 Overhead Lines (Exemption) Regulations 1992 (S.I. 1992/3074)
 Companies (Summary Financial Statement) Regulations 1992 (S.I. 1992/3075)
 Gaming (Bingo) Act (Variation of Monetary Limit) Order 1992 (S.I. 1992/3076)
 Goods Vehicles (Community Authorisations) Regulations 1992 (S.I. 1992/3077)
 Forest Reproductive Material (Amendment) Regulations 1992 (S.I. 1992/3078)
 Internal Drainage Boards (Finance) Regulations 1992 (S.I. 1992/3079)
 Medicines (Veterinary Drugs) (Pharmacy and Merchants' List) (Amendment) Order 1992 (S.I. 1992/3081)
 Non-Domestic Rating Contributions (England) Regulations 1992 (S.I. 1992/3082)
 Local Government Superannuation (Remuneration) Regulations 1992 (S.I. 1992/3083)
 Motor Vehicles (Type Approval for Goods Vehicles) (Great Britain) (Amendment) (No. 3) Regulations 1992 (S.I. 1992/3084)
 Motor Vehicles (Driving Licences) (Heavy Goods and Public Service Vehicles) (Amendment) Regulations 1992 (S.I. 1992/3085)
 Motor Vehicles (Designation of Approval Marks) (Amendment) (No. 2) Regulations 1992 (S.I. 1992/3086)
 Motor Vehicles Tyres (Safety) (Amendment) Regulations 1992 (S.I. 1992/3087)
 Road Vehicles (Construction and Use) (Amendment) (No. 7) Regulations 1992 (S.I. 1992/3088)
 Motor Vehicles (Driving Licences) (Large Goods and Passenger-Carrying Vehicles) (Amendment) (No. 5) Regulations 1992 (S.I. 1992/3089)
 Motor Vehicles (Driving Licences) (Amendment) (No. 4) Regulations 1992 (S.I. 1992/3090)
 Patents (Supplementary Protection Certificate for Medicinal Products) Regulations 1992 (S.I. 1992/3091)
 Export of Goods (Control) Order 1992 (S.I. 1992/3092)
 Non-automatic Weighing Instruments (EEC Requirements) (Fees) Regulations 1992 (S.I. 1992/3093)
 Child Support Fees Regulations 1992 (S.I. 1992/3094)
 Customs and Excise (Single Market etc.) Regulations 1992 (S.I. 1992/3095)
 Value Added Tax (EC Sales Statements) Regulations 1992 (S.I. 1992/3096)
 Value Added Tax (Accounting and Records) (Amendment) Regulations 1992 (S.I. 1992/3097)
 Value Added Tax (Repayment to Community Traders) (Amendment) Regulations 1992 (S.I. 1992/3098)
 Value Added Tax (Valuation of Acquisitions) Regulations 1992 (S.I. 1992/3099)
 Value Added Tax (Refunds in relation to New Means of Transport) Regulations 1992 (S.I. 1992/3100)

3101-3200

 Value Added Tax (Removal of Goods) (Accounting) Regulations 1992 (S.I. 1992/3101)
 Value Added Tax (General) (Amendment) (No. 4) Regulations 1992 (S.I. 1992/3102)
 Value Added Tax (Flat-rate Scheme for Farmers) Regulations 1992 (S.I. 1992/3103)
 Finance (No. 2) Act 1992 (Commencement No. 3) Order 1992 (S.I. 1992/3104)
 Road Traffic Act 1988 (Amendment) Regulations 1992 (S.I. 1992/3105)
 Gloucestershire Airport (Designation) (Detention and Sale of Aircraft) Order 1992 (S.I. 1992/3106)
 Motor Vehicles (EC Type Approval) Regulations 1992 (S.I. 1992/3107)
 Fishing Boats (European Economic Community) Designation (Variation) Order 1992 (S.I. 1992/3108)
 Local Government Act 1988 (Defined Activities) (Exemption) (Kettering Borough Council) Order 1992 (S.I. 1992/3109)
 Street Works (Reinstatement) (Amendment) Regulations 1992 (S.I. 1992/3110)
 Value Added Tax (Removal of Goods) Order 1992 (S.I. 1992/3111)
 Savings Contract (Amendment) Regulations 1992 (S.I. 1992/3112)
 Savings Certificates (Children's Bonus Bonds) (Amendment) Regulations 1992 (S.I. 1992/3113)
 Savings Certificates (Yearly Plan) (Amendment) Regulations 1992 (S.I. 1992/3114)
 Savings Certificates (Amendment) (No. 2) Regulations 1992 (S.I. 1992/3115)
 Premium Savings Bonds (Amendment) (No.2) Regulations 1992 (S.I. 1992/3116)
 Friendly Societies Act 1992 (Commencement No. 2) Order 1992 (S.I. 1992/3117)
 Value Added Tax (Small Non-Commercial Consignments) Relief (Amendment) Order 1992 (S.I. 1992/3118)
 Value Added Tax (Temporarily Imported Goods and Goods Imported for Private Purposes) Reliefs (Revocation) Order 1992 (S.I. 1992/3119)
 Value Added Tax (Imported Goods) Relief (Amendment) Order 1992 (S.I. 1992/3120)
 Value Added Tax (Place of Supply of Services) Order 1992 (S.I. 1992/3121)
 Value Added Tax (Cars) Order 1992 (S.I. 1992/3122)
 Value Added Tax (Input Tax) (Specified Supplies) Order 1992 (S.I. 1992/3123)
 Value Added Tax (Imported Gold) Relief Order 1992 (S.I. 1992/3124)
 Value Added Tax (Tour Operators) (Amendment) Order 1992 (S.I. 1992/3125)
 Value Added Tax (Transport) Order 1992 (S.I. 1992/3126)
 Value Added Tax (Means of Transport) Order 1992 (S.I. 1992/3127)
 Value Added Tax (Reverse Charge) Order 1992 (S.I. 1992/3128)
 Value Added Tax (Special Provisions) Order 1992 (S.I. 1992/3129)
 Value Added Tax (Supply of Temporarily Imported Goods) Order 1992 (S.I. 1992/3130)
 Value Added Tax (Tax Free Shops) Order 1992 (S.I. 1992/3131)
 Value Added Tax (Treatment of Transactions) (No.2) Order 1992 (S.I. 1992/3132)
 Income Tax (Definition of Unit Trust Scheme) (Amendment No. 2) Regulations 1992 (S.I. 1992/3133)
 Tobacco for Oral Use (Safety) Regulations 1992 (S.I. 1992/3134)
 Excise Goods (Holding, Movement, Warehousing and REDS) Regulations 1992 (S.I. 1992/3135)
 Milk and Dairies (Standardisation and Importation) (Scotland) Regulations 1992 (S.I. 1992/3136)
 Town and Country Planning (Fees for Applications and Deemed Applications) (Scotland) Amendment (No.2) Regulations 1992 (S.I. 1992/3137)
 Transport and Works Applications (Listed Buildings, Conservation Areas and Ancient Monuments Procedure) Regulations 1992 (S.I. 1992/3138)
 Personal Protective Equipment (EC Directive) Regulations 1992 (S.I. 1992/3139)
 Education (National Curriculum) (Attainment Targets and Programmes of Study in Welsh) (Amendment) (No. 2) Order 1992 (S.I. 1992/3140)
 Agricultural Wages Committees (Areas) (England) Order 1992 (S.I. 1992/3141)
 Milk Marketing Schemes (Amendment) (Standardisation) Regulations 1992 (S.I. 1992/3142)
 Milk and Dairies (Standardisation and Importation) Regulations 1992 (S.I. 1992/3143)
 Transport and Works Act 1992 (Commencement No. 4) Order 1992 (S.I. 1992/3144)
 Plastic Materials and Articles in Contact with Food Regulations 1992 (S.I. 1992/3145)
 Active Implantable Medical Devices Regulations 1992 (S.I. 1992/3146)
 Social Security Benefits (Amendments Consequential Upon the Introduction of Community Care) Regulations 1992 (S.I. 1992/3147)
 Smoke Control Areas (Authorised Fuels) (Amendment) (No. 2) Regulations 1992 (S.I. 1992/3148)
 Hydrocarbon Oil (Amendment) Regulations 1992 (S.I. 1992/3149)
 Revenue Traders (Accounts and Records) Regulations 1992 (S.I. 1992/3150)
 Excise Goods (Drawback) Regulations 1992 (S.I. 1992/3151)
 Excise Duties (Deferred Payment) Regulations 1992 (S.I. 1992/3152)
 Value Added Tax (Repayments to Third Country Traders) (Amendment) Regulations 1992 (S.I. 1992/3153)
 Tobacco Products (Amendment) Regulations 1992 (S.I. 1992/3154)
 Excise Duties (Personal Reliefs) Order 1992 (S.I. 1992/3155)
 Customs and Excise (Personal Reliefs for Special Visitors) Order 1992 (S.I. 1992/3156)
 Excise Duty (Relief on Alcoholic Ingredients) (Amendments) Regulations 1992 (S.I. 1992/3157)
 Excise Duty (Amendment of the Alcoholic Liquor Duties Act 1979 and the Hydrocarbon Oil Duties Act 1979) Regulations 1992 (S.I. 1992/3158)
 Specified Diseases (Notification and Slaughter) Order 1992 (S.I. 1992/3159)
 Motor Vehicles (Tests) (Amendment) (No. 3) Regulations 1992 (S.I. 1992/3160)
 Artificial Insemination of Pigs (EEC) Regulations 1992 (S.I. 1992/3161)
 Patents (Supplementary Protection Certificate for Medicinal Products) Rules 1992 (S.I. 1992/3162)
 Food Safety (Fishery Products) Regulations 1992 (S.I. 1992/3163)
 Food Safety (Live Bivalve Molluscs and Other Shellfish) Regulations 1992 (S.I. 1992/3164)
 Food Safety (Fishery Products on Fishing Vessels) Regulations 1992 (S.I. 1992/3165)
 Combined Probation Areas (Warwickshire) Order 1992 (S.I. 1992/3166)
 Taxes (Interest Rate) (Amendment No. 6) Regulations 1992 (S.I. 1992/3167)
 Education (Individual Pupils' Achievements) (Information) Regulations 1992 (S.I. 1992/3168)
 Combined Probation Areas (Hampshire) Order 1992 (S.I. 1992/3169)
 Police (Scotland) Amendment (No.2) Regulations 1992 (S.I. 1992/3170)
 Non-Domestic Ratepayers (Consultation) Regulations 1992 (S.I. 1992/3171)
 Employers' Liability (Compulsory Insurance) Exemption (Amendment) Regulations 1992 (S.I. 1992/3172)
 Farm and Conservation Grant (Amendment) Regulations 1992 (S.I. 1992/3174)
 Farm Business Non-Capital Grant (Amendment) Scheme 1992 (S.I. 1992/3175)
 Housing (Change of Landlord) (Payment of Disposal Cost by Instalments) (Amendment) (No. 3) Regulations 1992 (S.I. 1992/3176)
 Ashford Hospitals National Health Service Trust (Change of Name) Order 1992 (S.I. 1992/3177)
 Companies Act 1985 (Disclosure of Branches and Bank Accounts) Regulations 1992 (S.I. 1992/3178)
 Oversea Companies and Credit and Financial Institutions (Branch Disclosure) Regulations 1992 (S.I. 1992/3179)
 Income Tax (Employments) (No. 23) Regulations 1992 (S.I. 1992/3180)
 Inheritance Tax (Market Makers) Regulations 1992 (S.I. 1992/3181)
 Residential Accommodation (Determination of District Health Authority) Regulations 1992 (S.I. 1992/3182)
 Acquisition of Land (Rate of Interest after Entry) Regulations 1992 (S.I. 1992/3183)
 Food Protection (Emergency Prohibitions) (Dioxins) (England) (No.2) (Revocation) Order 1992 (S.I. 1992/3188)
 Imitation Dummies (Safety) Regulations 1992 (S.I. 1992/3189)
 Customs Duty (Personal Reliefs) (Amendment) Order 1992 (S.I. 1992/3192)
 Customs and Excise Duties (Personal Reliefs for Goods Permanently Imported) Order 1992 Approved by the House of Commons S.I. 1992/3193)
 Social Security (Overlapping Benefits) Amendment (No. 2) Regulations 1992 (S.I. 1992/3194)
 European Communities (Designation) (No. 5) Order 1992 (S.I. 1992/3197)
 Air Navigation (Overseas Territories) (Amendment) Order 1992 (S.I. 1992/3198)
 Child Abduction and Custody (Parties to Conventions) (Amendment) (No. 5) Order 1992 (S.I. 1992/3199)
 Extradition (Hijacking) Order 1992 (S.I. 1992/3200)

3201-3300

 Merchant Shipping (Conformation of Legislation) (Virgin Islands) Order 1992 (S.I. 1992/3201)
 Criminal Justice Act 1982 (Guernsey) Order 1992 (S.I. 1992/3202)
 Private Streets (Amendment) (Northern Ireland) Order 1992 (S.I. 1992/3203)
 Registered Homes (Northern Ireland) Order 1992 (S.I. 1992/3204)
 Wireless Telegraphy Appeal Tribunal (Isle of Man) Order 1992 (S.I. 1992/3205)
 Double Taxation Relief (Taxes on Income) (Falkland Islands) Order 1992 (S.I. 1992/3206)
 Double Taxation Relief (Taxes on Income) (Guyana) Order 1992 (S.I. 1992/3207)
 Naval, Military and Air Forces etc. (Disablement and Death) Service Pensions Amendment (No.2) Order 1992 (S.I. 1992/3208)
 Social Security (Austria) Order 1992 (S.I. 1992/3209)
 Social Security (Finland) Order 1992 (S.I. 1992/3210)
 Social Security (Iceland) Order 1992 (S.I. 1992/3211)
 Social Security (Norway) Order 1992 (S.I. 1992/3212)
 Social Security (Sweden) Order 1992 (S.I. 1992/3213)
 Marriage Fees (Scotland) Regulations 1992 (S.I. 1992/3214)
 Registration of Births, Deaths, Marriages and Divorces (Fees) (Scotland) Regulations 1992 (S.I. 1992/3215)
 Registration of Births, Deaths and Marriages (Fees) (Scotland) Order 1992 (S.I. 1992/3216)
 Genetically Modified Organisms (Contained Use) Regulations 1992 (S.I. 1992/3217)
 Banking Coordination (Second Council Directive) Regulations 1992 (S.I. 1992/3218)
 Income Tax (Interest Relief) (Qualifying Lenders) (No. 2) Order 1992 (S.I. 1992/3219)
 Value Added Tax (Flat-rate Scheme for Farmers) (Designated Activities) Order 1992 (S.I. 1992/3220)
 Value Added Tax (Flat-rate Scheme for Farmers) (Percentage Addition) Order 1992 (S.I. 1992/3221)
 Value Added Tax (Input Tax) Order 1992 (S.I. 1992/3222)
 Value Added Tax (International Services and Transport) Order 1992 (S.I. 1992/3223)
 Postal Packets (Customs and Excise) (Amendment) Regulations 1992 (S.I. 1992/3224)
 Acquisition of Land (Rate of Interest after Entry) (Scotland) (No. 2) Regulations 1992 (S.I. 1992/3225)
 Personal Injuries (Civilians) Amendment (No.2) Scheme 1992 (S.I. 1992/3226)
 Children and Young Persons (Protection from Tobacco) Act 1991 (Commencement No.3) Order 1992 (S.I. 1992/3227)
 Protection from Tobacco (Display of Warning Statements) Regulations 1992 (S.I. 1992/3228)
 Local Government Superannuation (Merseyside Transport Limited) Regulations 1992 (S.I. 1992/3229)
 Transport and Works (Descriptions of Works Interfering with Navigation) Order 1992 (S.I. 1992/3230)
 Transport and Works (Guided Transport Modes) Order 1992 (S.I. 1992/3231)
 Mallaig Harbour Revision Order 1992 (S.I. 1992/3232)
 Copyright (Computer Programs) Regulations 1992 (S.I. 1992/3233)
 Income Tax (Prescribed Deposit-takers) Order 1992 (S.I. 1992/3234)
 Plant Health (Forestry) (Great Britain) (Amendment) Order 1992 (S.I. 1992/3235)
 Aflatoxins in Nuts, Nut Products, Dried Figs and Dried Fig Products Regulations 1992 (S.I. 1992/3236)
 Education (Grants) (Higher Education Corporations) Regulations 1992 (S.I. 1992/3237)
 Non-Domestic Rating Contributions (Wales) Regulations 1992 (S.I. 1992/3238)
 Billing Authorities (Anticipation of Precepts) Regulations 1992 (S.I. 1992/3239)
 Environmental Information Regulations 1992 Approved by both Houses of Parliament S.I. 1992/3240)
 Local Government Act 1992 (Commencement No.2) Order 1992 (S.I. 1992/3241)
 Disposal of Records (Scotland) Regulations 1992 (S.I. 1992/3247)
 Environmental Protection Act 1990 (Commencement No. 12) Order 1992 (S.I. 1992/3253)
 Act of Sederunt (Commissary Court Books) 1992 (S.I. 1992/3256)
 Local Authorities (Capital Finance) (Amendment) (No. 4) Regulations 1992 (S.I. 1992/3257)
 Non—Domestic Rating Contributions (England) (Amendment) Regulations 1992 (S.I. 1992/3259)
 Finance (No. 2) Act 1992 (Commencement No. 4 and Transitional Provisions) Order 1992 (S.I. 1992/3261)
 Haddock and Hake (Specified Sea Areas) (Prohibition of Fishing) Order 1992 (S.I. 1992/3262)
 Sole (Specified Sea Areas) (Prohibition of Fishing) Order 1992 (S.I. 1992/3266)
 Firearms (Northern Ireland) Order 1981 (Amendment) Regulations 1992 (S.I. 1992/3267)
 Combined Probation Areas (West Yorkshire) (Amendment) Order 1992 (S.I. 1992/3268)
 Whiting (Specified Sea Areas) (Prohibition of Fishing) Order 1992 (S.I. 1992/3269)
 Transport and Works (Model Clauses for Railways and Tramways) Order 1992 (S.I. 1992/3270)
 Medicines Act 1968 (Amendment) (No. 2) Regulations 1992 (S.I. 1992/3271)
 Medicines (Standard Provisions for Licences and Certificates) Amendment (No. 2) Regulations 1992 (S.I. 1992/3272)
 Medicines (Labelling) Amendment Regulations 1992 (S.I. 1992/3273)
 Medicines (Leaflets) Amendment Regulations 1992 (S.I. 1992/3274)
 Education Support Grants Regulations 1992 (S.I. 1992/3275)
 Utilities Supply and Works Contracts Regulations 1992 (S.I. 1992/3279)
 Genetically Modified Organisms (Deliberate Release) Regulations 1992 (S.I. 1992/3280)
 Driving Licences (Designation of Relevant External Law) Order 1992 (S.I. 1992/3281)
 Value Added Tax (Place of Supply of Goods) Order 1992 (S.I. 1992/3283)
 Severn Bridges Tolls (No. 2) Order 1992 (S.I. 1992/3284)
 Road Vehicles (Construction and Use) (Amendment) (No. 8) Regulations 1992 (S.I. 1992/3285)
 Finance Act 1986 (Stamp Duty and Stamp Duty Reserve Tax) (Amendment) Regulations 1992 (S.I. 1992/3286)
 Stamp Duty Reserve Tax (Amendment) Regulations 1992 (S.I. 1992/3287)
 Package Travel, Package Holidays and Package Tours Regulations 1992 (S.I. 1992/3288)
 Origin of Goods (Petroleum Products) (Amendment) Regulations 1992 (S.I. 1992/3289)
 Council Tax (Administration and Enforcement) (Scotland) Amendment Regulations 1992 (S.I. 1992/3290)
 Crofting Counties Agricultural Grants (Scotland) Amendment Scheme 1992 (S.I. 1992/3291)
 Local Government Finance (Garden Squares) (Consequential Amendments) Order 1992 (S.I. 1992/3292)
 Animal Health Act 1981 (Amendments) Regulations 1992 (S.I. 1992/3293)
 Bananas (Interim Measures) Regulations 1992 (S.I. 1992/3294)
 Animals and Animal Products (Import and Export) Regulations 1992 (S.I. 1992/3295)
 Plant Health (Great Britain) (Amendment) Order 1992 (S.I. 1992/3297)
 Products of Animal Origin (Import and Export) Regulations 1992 (S.I. 1992/3298)
 Products of Animal Origin (Third country Imports) (Charges) Regulations 1992 (S.I. 1992/3299)
 Fish Health Regulations 1992 (S.I. 1992/3300)

3301-3400

 Shellfish and Specified Fish (Third Country Imports) Order 1992 (S.I. 1992/3301)
 Destructive Imported Animals Act 1932 (Amendment) Regulations 1992 (S.I. 1992/3302)
 Animal By-Products Order 1992 (S.I. 1992/3303)
 Welfare of Animals during Transport Order 1992 (S.I. 1992/3304)
 Export of Goods (Control) Order 1992 (Amendment) Order 1992 (S.I. 1992/3305)
 Orkney Islands Area (Electoral Arrangements) Order 1992 (S.I. 1992/3307) (S. 280)
 Monklands and Bellshill Hospitals National Health Service Trust (Establishment) Order 1992 (S.I. 1992/3308)
 Moray Health Services National Health Service Trust (Establishment) Order 1992 (S.I. 1992/3309)
 West Lothian National Health Service Trust (Establishment) Order 1992 (S.I. 1992/3310)
 North Ayrshire and Arran National Health Service Trust (Establishment) Order 1992 (S.I. 1992/3311)
 Ayrshire and Arran Community Health Care National Health Service Trust (Establishment) Order 1992 (S.I. 1992/3312)
 Caithness and Sutherland National Health Service Trust (Establishment) Order 1992 (S.I. 1992/3313)
 Southern General Hospital National Health Service Trust (Establishment) Order 1992 (S.I. 1992/3314)
 Grampian Healthcare National Health Service Trust (Establishment) Order 1992 (S.I. 1992/3315)
 Royal Alexandra Hospital National Health Service Trust (Establishment) Order 1992 (S.I. 1992/3316)
 Victoria Infirmary National Health Service Trust (Establishment) Order 1992 (S.I. 1992/3317)
 Stirling Royal Infirmary National Health Service Trust (Establishment) Order 1992 (S.I. 1992/3318)
 Raigmore Hospital National Health Service Trust (Establishment) Order 1992 (S.I. 1992/3319)
 Dundee Teaching Hospitals National Health Service Trust (Establishment) Order 1992 (S.I. 1992/3320)
 Yorkhill National Health Service Trust (Establishment) Order 1992 (S.I. 1992/3321)
 Western Isles Islands Area (Electoral Arrangements) Order 1992 (S.I. 1992/3322) (S. 281)
 Combined Probation Areas (Hereford and Worcester) Order 1992 (S.I. 1992/3323)
 Mink Keeping Order 1992 (S.I. 1992/3324)
 London Residuary Body (Number of Members) Order 1992 (S.I. 1992/3325)
 Borough Council of Sandwell (Black Country Spine Road) (Tame Valley Canal Bridge) Scheme 1992 Confirmation Instrument 1992 (S.I. 1992/3326)
 Borough Council of Sandwell (Black Country Spine Road) (Ryders Green Locks Canal Bridge) Scheme 1992 Confirmation Instrument 1992 (S.I. 1992/3327)
 Borough Council of Sandwell (Black Country Spine Road) (Balls Hill Branch/Ridgacre Branch Canal Bridges) Scheme 1992 Confirmation Instrument 1992 (S.I. 1992/3328)
 Customs Duties (ECSC) (Quota and other Reliefs) Order 1992 (S.I. 1992/3329)
 County Court (Amendment No. 3) Rules 1992 (S.I. 1992/3348)
 Access to Neighbouring Land Act 1992 (Commencement) Order 1992 (S.I. 1992/3349)
 College of St. Mark and St. John Scheme (Modification) Order 1992 (S.I. 1992/3351)
 A6 Trunk Road (Clapham Bypass) Order 1992 (S.I. 1992/3354)
 A6 Trunk Road (North of Bedford-South of Milton Ernest) Detrunking Order 1992 (S.I. 1992/3355)

External links
Legislation.gov.uk delivered by the UK National Archive
UK SI's on legislation.gov.uk
UK Draft SI's on legislation.gov.uk

See also
List of Statutory Instruments of the United Kingdom

Lists of Statutory Instruments of the United Kingdom
Statutory Instruments